

559001–559100 

|-bgcolor=#d6d6d6
| 559001 ||  || — || September 11, 2007 || Mount Lemmon || Mount Lemmon Survey || LIX || align=right | 3.1 km || 
|-id=002 bgcolor=#E9E9E9
| 559002 ||  || — || January 17, 2015 || Haleakala || Pan-STARRS ||  || align=right | 1.6 km || 
|-id=003 bgcolor=#d6d6d6
| 559003 ||  || — || August 11, 2012 || Bergisch Gladbach || W. Bickel ||  || align=right | 2.6 km || 
|-id=004 bgcolor=#E9E9E9
| 559004 ||  || — || November 24, 2009 || Kitt Peak || Spacewatch ||  || align=right | 2.0 km || 
|-id=005 bgcolor=#d6d6d6
| 559005 ||  || — || May 31, 2011 || ESA OGS || ESA OGS ||  || align=right | 3.4 km || 
|-id=006 bgcolor=#d6d6d6
| 559006 ||  || — || September 29, 2008 || Catalina || CSS ||  || align=right | 2.5 km || 
|-id=007 bgcolor=#d6d6d6
| 559007 ||  || — || January 18, 2005 || Kitt Peak || Spacewatch ||  || align=right | 2.5 km || 
|-id=008 bgcolor=#d6d6d6
| 559008 ||  || — || October 23, 2008 || Mount Lemmon || Mount Lemmon Survey ||  || align=right | 1.8 km || 
|-id=009 bgcolor=#d6d6d6
| 559009 ||  || — || October 26, 2008 || Mount Lemmon || Mount Lemmon Survey ||  || align=right | 2.9 km || 
|-id=010 bgcolor=#d6d6d6
| 559010 ||  || — || November 30, 2003 || Kitt Peak || Spacewatch ||  || align=right | 2.9 km || 
|-id=011 bgcolor=#E9E9E9
| 559011 ||  || — || October 25, 2009 || Mount Lemmon || Mount Lemmon Survey ||  || align=right | 2.2 km || 
|-id=012 bgcolor=#E9E9E9
| 559012 ||  || — || March 27, 2011 || Mount Lemmon || Mount Lemmon Survey ||  || align=right | 2.1 km || 
|-id=013 bgcolor=#d6d6d6
| 559013 ||  || — || December 29, 2014 || Haleakala || Pan-STARRS ||  || align=right | 2.5 km || 
|-id=014 bgcolor=#d6d6d6
| 559014 ||  || — || July 19, 2006 || Kitt Peak || Mauna Kea Obs. || THM || align=right | 1.9 km || 
|-id=015 bgcolor=#d6d6d6
| 559015 ||  || — || February 18, 2010 || Kitt Peak || Spacewatch ||  || align=right | 3.3 km || 
|-id=016 bgcolor=#d6d6d6
| 559016 ||  || — || October 26, 2008 || Mount Lemmon || Mount Lemmon Survey ||  || align=right | 2.4 km || 
|-id=017 bgcolor=#E9E9E9
| 559017 ||  || — || September 30, 1995 || Kitt Peak || Spacewatch ||  || align=right | 1.9 km || 
|-id=018 bgcolor=#d6d6d6
| 559018 ||  || — || February 17, 2010 || Kitt Peak || Spacewatch ||  || align=right | 2.3 km || 
|-id=019 bgcolor=#d6d6d6
| 559019 ||  || — || November 28, 2013 || Mount Lemmon || Mount Lemmon Survey ||  || align=right | 2.6 km || 
|-id=020 bgcolor=#d6d6d6
| 559020 ||  || — || April 3, 2010 || Kitt Peak || Spacewatch ||  || align=right | 2.8 km || 
|-id=021 bgcolor=#d6d6d6
| 559021 ||  || — || December 21, 2014 || Haleakala || Pan-STARRS ||  || align=right | 3.1 km || 
|-id=022 bgcolor=#d6d6d6
| 559022 ||  || — || August 26, 2012 || Haleakala || Pan-STARRS ||  || align=right | 3.5 km || 
|-id=023 bgcolor=#d6d6d6
| 559023 ||  || — || April 9, 2010 || Palomar || PTF ||  || align=right | 3.4 km || 
|-id=024 bgcolor=#d6d6d6
| 559024 ||  || — || December 28, 2014 || Mount Lemmon || Mount Lemmon Survey ||  || align=right | 2.5 km || 
|-id=025 bgcolor=#d6d6d6
| 559025 ||  || — || August 10, 2007 || Kitt Peak || Spacewatch ||  || align=right | 2.2 km || 
|-id=026 bgcolor=#d6d6d6
| 559026 ||  || — || August 21, 2008 || Kitt Peak || Spacewatch ||  || align=right | 1.9 km || 
|-id=027 bgcolor=#E9E9E9
| 559027 ||  || — || October 9, 2013 || Haleakala || Pan-STARRS ||  || align=right | 2.0 km || 
|-id=028 bgcolor=#d6d6d6
| 559028 ||  || — || December 21, 2014 || Haleakala || Pan-STARRS ||  || align=right | 1.8 km || 
|-id=029 bgcolor=#d6d6d6
| 559029 ||  || — || October 5, 2013 || Haleakala || Pan-STARRS ||  || align=right | 1.8 km || 
|-id=030 bgcolor=#d6d6d6
| 559030 ||  || — || December 19, 2009 || Mount Lemmon || Mount Lemmon Survey ||  || align=right | 2.0 km || 
|-id=031 bgcolor=#E9E9E9
| 559031 ||  || — || April 21, 2012 || Mount Lemmon || Mount Lemmon Survey ||  || align=right | 2.0 km || 
|-id=032 bgcolor=#d6d6d6
| 559032 ||  || — || November 21, 2003 || Kitt Peak || Kitt Peak Obs. ||  || align=right | 2.6 km || 
|-id=033 bgcolor=#E9E9E9
| 559033 ||  || — || June 8, 2012 || Mount Lemmon || Mount Lemmon Survey ||  || align=right | 2.0 km || 
|-id=034 bgcolor=#d6d6d6
| 559034 ||  || — || October 26, 2013 || Catalina || CSS ||  || align=right | 2.7 km || 
|-id=035 bgcolor=#d6d6d6
| 559035 ||  || — || June 15, 2012 || Kitt Peak || Spacewatch ||  || align=right | 2.9 km || 
|-id=036 bgcolor=#E9E9E9
| 559036 ||  || — || December 18, 2009 || Mount Lemmon || Mount Lemmon Survey ||  || align=right | 1.8 km || 
|-id=037 bgcolor=#d6d6d6
| 559037 ||  || — || October 24, 2013 || Mount Lemmon || Mount Lemmon Survey ||  || align=right | 2.2 km || 
|-id=038 bgcolor=#d6d6d6
| 559038 ||  || — || January 20, 2015 || Haleakala || Pan-STARRS ||  || align=right | 2.1 km || 
|-id=039 bgcolor=#d6d6d6
| 559039 ||  || — || October 6, 2008 || Kitt Peak || Spacewatch ||  || align=right | 2.0 km || 
|-id=040 bgcolor=#d6d6d6
| 559040 ||  || — || January 20, 2015 || Haleakala || Pan-STARRS ||  || align=right | 1.7 km || 
|-id=041 bgcolor=#d6d6d6
| 559041 ||  || — || January 20, 2015 || Kitt Peak || Pan-STARRS || THM || align=right | 2.1 km || 
|-id=042 bgcolor=#d6d6d6
| 559042 ||  || — || November 27, 2009 || Kitt Peak || Spacewatch ||  || align=right | 2.9 km || 
|-id=043 bgcolor=#d6d6d6
| 559043 ||  || — || October 5, 2013 || Haleakala || Pan-STARRS || EMA || align=right | 2.5 km || 
|-id=044 bgcolor=#E9E9E9
| 559044 ||  || — || October 3, 2013 || Haleakala || Pan-STARRS ||  || align=right | 1.6 km || 
|-id=045 bgcolor=#d6d6d6
| 559045 ||  || — || October 24, 2013 || Mount Lemmon || Mount Lemmon Survey ||  || align=right | 1.6 km || 
|-id=046 bgcolor=#E9E9E9
| 559046 ||  || — || December 3, 2005 || Mauna Kea || Mauna Kea Obs. ||  || align=right | 2.2 km || 
|-id=047 bgcolor=#d6d6d6
| 559047 ||  || — || January 20, 2015 || Kitt Peak || Spacewatch ||  || align=right | 2.2 km || 
|-id=048 bgcolor=#d6d6d6
| 559048 ||  || — || January 11, 2010 || Kitt Peak || Spacewatch ||  || align=right | 1.6 km || 
|-id=049 bgcolor=#d6d6d6
| 559049 ||  || — || December 22, 2008 || Mount Lemmon || Mount Lemmon Survey ||  || align=right | 1.9 km || 
|-id=050 bgcolor=#d6d6d6
| 559050 ||  || — || September 21, 2007 || Kitt Peak || Spacewatch ||  || align=right | 2.9 km || 
|-id=051 bgcolor=#d6d6d6
| 559051 ||  || — || January 20, 2015 || Haleakala || Pan-STARRS ||  || align=right | 2.4 km || 
|-id=052 bgcolor=#d6d6d6
| 559052 ||  || — || November 6, 2013 || Haleakala || Pan-STARRS ||  || align=right | 2.9 km || 
|-id=053 bgcolor=#d6d6d6
| 559053 ||  || — || August 13, 2006 || Palomar || NEAT ||  || align=right | 3.6 km || 
|-id=054 bgcolor=#d6d6d6
| 559054 ||  || — || September 22, 2008 || Kitt Peak || Spacewatch ||  || align=right | 1.9 km || 
|-id=055 bgcolor=#d6d6d6
| 559055 ||  || — || January 20, 2015 || Haleakala || Pan-STARRS ||  || align=right | 1.8 km || 
|-id=056 bgcolor=#d6d6d6
| 559056 ||  || — || March 11, 2005 || Kitt Peak || Spacewatch ||  || align=right | 2.5 km || 
|-id=057 bgcolor=#d6d6d6
| 559057 ||  || — || August 26, 2012 || Haleakala || Pan-STARRS ||  || align=right | 2.2 km || 
|-id=058 bgcolor=#d6d6d6
| 559058 ||  || — || October 6, 2008 || Kitt Peak || Spacewatch ||  || align=right | 2.0 km || 
|-id=059 bgcolor=#d6d6d6
| 559059 ||  || — || January 20, 2015 || Haleakala || Pan-STARRS ||  || align=right | 2.5 km || 
|-id=060 bgcolor=#d6d6d6
| 559060 ||  || — || January 20, 2015 || Haleakala || Pan-STARRS ||  || align=right | 2.3 km || 
|-id=061 bgcolor=#d6d6d6
| 559061 ||  || — || December 30, 2008 || Mount Lemmon || Mount Lemmon Survey ||  || align=right | 3.1 km || 
|-id=062 bgcolor=#d6d6d6
| 559062 ||  || — || August 14, 2012 || Haleakala || Pan-STARRS ||  || align=right | 2.3 km || 
|-id=063 bgcolor=#d6d6d6
| 559063 ||  || — || November 11, 2013 || Mount Lemmon || Mount Lemmon Survey ||  || align=right | 2.4 km || 
|-id=064 bgcolor=#d6d6d6
| 559064 ||  || — || December 31, 2008 || Kitt Peak || Spacewatch ||  || align=right | 2.0 km || 
|-id=065 bgcolor=#d6d6d6
| 559065 ||  || — || August 25, 2012 || Mount Lemmon || Mount Lemmon Survey ||  || align=right | 2.4 km || 
|-id=066 bgcolor=#d6d6d6
| 559066 ||  || — || September 15, 2013 || Mount Lemmon || Mount Lemmon Survey ||  || align=right | 2.3 km || 
|-id=067 bgcolor=#d6d6d6
| 559067 ||  || — || May 26, 2011 || Mount Lemmon || Mount Lemmon Survey ||  || align=right | 2.4 km || 
|-id=068 bgcolor=#d6d6d6
| 559068 ||  || — || October 17, 2012 || Haleakala || Pan-STARRS || 3:2 || align=right | 3.4 km || 
|-id=069 bgcolor=#d6d6d6
| 559069 ||  || — || November 19, 2003 || Kitt Peak || Spacewatch ||  || align=right | 2.1 km || 
|-id=070 bgcolor=#d6d6d6
| 559070 ||  || — || January 20, 2015 || Haleakala || Pan-STARRS ||  || align=right | 2.0 km || 
|-id=071 bgcolor=#d6d6d6
| 559071 ||  || — || December 7, 2013 || Kitt Peak || Spacewatch ||  || align=right | 2.8 km || 
|-id=072 bgcolor=#d6d6d6
| 559072 ||  || — || October 28, 2013 || Mount Lemmon || Mount Lemmon Survey ||  || align=right | 2.5 km || 
|-id=073 bgcolor=#d6d6d6
| 559073 ||  || — || September 14, 2013 || Haleakala || Pan-STARRS ||  || align=right | 2.0 km || 
|-id=074 bgcolor=#d6d6d6
| 559074 ||  || — || September 10, 2007 || Kitt Peak || Mount Lemmon Survey || HYG || align=right | 2.2 km || 
|-id=075 bgcolor=#d6d6d6
| 559075 ||  || — || January 20, 2015 || Haleakala || Pan-STARRS ||  || align=right | 2.3 km || 
|-id=076 bgcolor=#d6d6d6
| 559076 ||  || — || January 20, 2015 || Haleakala || Pan-STARRS ||  || align=right | 2.6 km || 
|-id=077 bgcolor=#d6d6d6
| 559077 ||  || — || August 10, 2007 || Kitt Peak || Spacewatch ||  || align=right | 1.7 km || 
|-id=078 bgcolor=#d6d6d6
| 559078 ||  || — || February 26, 2004 || Kitt Peak || M. W. Buie, D. E. Trilling || EOS || align=right | 1.4 km || 
|-id=079 bgcolor=#d6d6d6
| 559079 ||  || — || January 20, 2015 || Kitt Peak || Spacewatch ||  || align=right | 3.3 km || 
|-id=080 bgcolor=#d6d6d6
| 559080 ||  || — || January 20, 2015 || Haleakala || Pan-STARRS ||  || align=right | 2.4 km || 
|-id=081 bgcolor=#d6d6d6
| 559081 ||  || — || October 8, 2012 || Mount Lemmon || Mount Lemmon Survey ||  || align=right | 2.3 km || 
|-id=082 bgcolor=#d6d6d6
| 559082 ||  || — || November 27, 2013 || Haleakala || Pan-STARRS ||  || align=right | 2.1 km || 
|-id=083 bgcolor=#d6d6d6
| 559083 ||  || — || March 12, 2010 || Mount Lemmon || Mount Lemmon Survey ||  || align=right | 2.9 km || 
|-id=084 bgcolor=#d6d6d6
| 559084 ||  || — || January 20, 2015 || Haleakala || Pan-STARRS ||  || align=right | 2.4 km || 
|-id=085 bgcolor=#d6d6d6
| 559085 ||  || — || January 20, 2015 || Haleakala || Pan-STARRS ||  || align=right | 2.3 km || 
|-id=086 bgcolor=#d6d6d6
| 559086 ||  || — || March 19, 2010 || Mount Lemmon || Mount Lemmon Survey ||  || align=right | 2.9 km || 
|-id=087 bgcolor=#d6d6d6
| 559087 ||  || — || January 20, 2015 || Haleakala || Pan-STARRS ||  || align=right | 2.7 km || 
|-id=088 bgcolor=#d6d6d6
| 559088 ||  || — || January 20, 2015 || Haleakala || Pan-STARRS ||  || align=right | 2.3 km || 
|-id=089 bgcolor=#d6d6d6
| 559089 ||  || — || January 20, 2015 || Kitt Peak || Pan-STARRS ||  || align=right | 2.5 km || 
|-id=090 bgcolor=#d6d6d6
| 559090 ||  || — || December 29, 2008 || Mount Lemmon || Mount Lemmon Survey ||  || align=right | 2.4 km || 
|-id=091 bgcolor=#d6d6d6
| 559091 ||  || — || January 20, 2015 || Haleakala || Pan-STARRS ||  || align=right | 2.7 km || 
|-id=092 bgcolor=#d6d6d6
| 559092 ||  || — || October 10, 2002 || Kitt Peak || Spacewatch || THM || align=right | 2.0 km || 
|-id=093 bgcolor=#d6d6d6
| 559093 ||  || — || January 20, 2015 || Haleakala || Pan-STARRS ||  || align=right | 2.1 km || 
|-id=094 bgcolor=#d6d6d6
| 559094 ||  || — || September 12, 2007 || Kitt Peak || Spacewatch ||  || align=right | 2.0 km || 
|-id=095 bgcolor=#d6d6d6
| 559095 ||  || — || September 12, 2007 || Mount Lemmon || Mount Lemmon Survey || THM || align=right | 2.3 km || 
|-id=096 bgcolor=#d6d6d6
| 559096 ||  || — || January 20, 2015 || Haleakala || Pan-STARRS ||  || align=right | 2.3 km || 
|-id=097 bgcolor=#d6d6d6
| 559097 ||  || — || September 12, 2007 || Mount Lemmon || Mount Lemmon Survey ||  || align=right | 2.3 km || 
|-id=098 bgcolor=#d6d6d6
| 559098 ||  || — || January 20, 2015 || Haleakala || Pan-STARRS ||  || align=right | 2.4 km || 
|-id=099 bgcolor=#d6d6d6
| 559099 ||  || — || January 20, 2015 || Haleakala || Pan-STARRS ||  || align=right | 2.1 km || 
|-id=100 bgcolor=#d6d6d6
| 559100 ||  || — || June 6, 2011 || Mount Lemmon || Mount Lemmon Survey ||  || align=right | 2.8 km || 
|}

559101–559200 

|-bgcolor=#d6d6d6
| 559101 ||  || — || December 27, 2013 || Mount Lemmon || Mount Lemmon Survey ||  || align=right | 2.0 km || 
|-id=102 bgcolor=#d6d6d6
| 559102 ||  || — || January 20, 2015 || Haleakala || Pan-STARRS ||  || align=right | 2.7 km || 
|-id=103 bgcolor=#d6d6d6
| 559103 ||  || — || November 11, 2013 || Mount Lemmon || Mount Lemmon Survey ||  || align=right | 2.2 km || 
|-id=104 bgcolor=#d6d6d6
| 559104 ||  || — || February 16, 2004 || Kitt Peak || Spacewatch ||  || align=right | 3.2 km || 
|-id=105 bgcolor=#d6d6d6
| 559105 ||  || — || September 12, 2007 || Mount Lemmon || Mount Lemmon Survey ||  || align=right | 2.7 km || 
|-id=106 bgcolor=#d6d6d6
| 559106 ||  || — || January 20, 2015 || Haleakala || Pan-STARRS ||  || align=right | 2.2 km || 
|-id=107 bgcolor=#d6d6d6
| 559107 ||  || — || July 27, 2001 || Anderson Mesa || LONEOS ||  || align=right | 2.6 km || 
|-id=108 bgcolor=#d6d6d6
| 559108 ||  || — || January 20, 2015 || Haleakala || Pan-STARRS ||  || align=right | 2.2 km || 
|-id=109 bgcolor=#d6d6d6
| 559109 ||  || — || September 4, 2007 || Mount Lemmon || Mount Lemmon Survey ||  || align=right | 2.1 km || 
|-id=110 bgcolor=#d6d6d6
| 559110 ||  || — || October 9, 2012 || Mount Lemmon || Mount Lemmon Survey ||  || align=right | 2.4 km || 
|-id=111 bgcolor=#d6d6d6
| 559111 ||  || — || October 19, 2006 || Kitt Peak || L. H. Wasserman ||  || align=right | 2.2 km || 
|-id=112 bgcolor=#d6d6d6
| 559112 ||  || — || January 20, 2015 || Haleakala || Pan-STARRS ||  || align=right | 2.4 km || 
|-id=113 bgcolor=#d6d6d6
| 559113 ||  || — || January 20, 2015 || Haleakala || Pan-STARRS ||  || align=right | 2.5 km || 
|-id=114 bgcolor=#d6d6d6
| 559114 ||  || — || January 20, 2015 || Haleakala || Pan-STARRS ||  || align=right | 1.8 km || 
|-id=115 bgcolor=#d6d6d6
| 559115 ||  || — || January 20, 2015 || Haleakala || Pan-STARRS ||  || align=right | 2.3 km || 
|-id=116 bgcolor=#d6d6d6
| 559116 ||  || — || September 28, 2003 || Kitt Peak || Spacewatch ||  || align=right | 2.3 km || 
|-id=117 bgcolor=#d6d6d6
| 559117 ||  || — || December 3, 2013 || Haleakala || Pan-STARRS ||  || align=right | 2.1 km || 
|-id=118 bgcolor=#d6d6d6
| 559118 ||  || — || August 10, 2007 || Kitt Peak || Spacewatch ||  || align=right | 2.1 km || 
|-id=119 bgcolor=#d6d6d6
| 559119 ||  || — || October 1, 2013 || Kitt Peak || Spacewatch ||  || align=right | 1.9 km || 
|-id=120 bgcolor=#d6d6d6
| 559120 ||  || — || January 20, 2015 || Haleakala || Pan-STARRS ||  || align=right | 3.0 km || 
|-id=121 bgcolor=#d6d6d6
| 559121 ||  || — || January 20, 2015 || Haleakala || Pan-STARRS ||  || align=right | 1.8 km || 
|-id=122 bgcolor=#d6d6d6
| 559122 ||  || — || January 20, 2015 || Haleakala || Pan-STARRS ||  || align=right | 2.3 km || 
|-id=123 bgcolor=#d6d6d6
| 559123 ||  || — || November 19, 2008 || Kitt Peak || Spacewatch || THM || align=right | 2.5 km || 
|-id=124 bgcolor=#d6d6d6
| 559124 ||  || — || September 22, 2012 || Mount Lemmon || Mount Lemmon Survey ||  || align=right | 2.4 km || 
|-id=125 bgcolor=#d6d6d6
| 559125 ||  || — || March 18, 2010 || Mount Lemmon || Mount Lemmon Survey ||  || align=right | 1.9 km || 
|-id=126 bgcolor=#d6d6d6
| 559126 ||  || — || April 30, 2011 || Mount Lemmon || Mount Lemmon Survey ||  || align=right | 2.8 km || 
|-id=127 bgcolor=#d6d6d6
| 559127 ||  || — || January 20, 2015 || Haleakala || Pan-STARRS ||  || align=right | 1.8 km || 
|-id=128 bgcolor=#d6d6d6
| 559128 ||  || — || October 27, 2013 || Kitt Peak || Spacewatch ||  || align=right | 2.5 km || 
|-id=129 bgcolor=#E9E9E9
| 559129 ||  || — || March 27, 2011 || Mount Lemmon || Mount Lemmon Survey ||  || align=right | 2.0 km || 
|-id=130 bgcolor=#d6d6d6
| 559130 ||  || — || November 2, 2013 || Mount Lemmon || Mount Lemmon Survey ||  || align=right | 2.5 km || 
|-id=131 bgcolor=#d6d6d6
| 559131 ||  || — || January 20, 2015 || Haleakala || Pan-STARRS ||  || align=right | 2.0 km || 
|-id=132 bgcolor=#d6d6d6
| 559132 ||  || — || November 29, 2013 || Mount Lemmon || Mount Lemmon Survey ||  || align=right | 2.8 km || 
|-id=133 bgcolor=#d6d6d6
| 559133 ||  || — || January 7, 1994 || Kitt Peak || Spacewatch ||  || align=right | 2.2 km || 
|-id=134 bgcolor=#d6d6d6
| 559134 ||  || — || November 1, 2013 || Mount Lemmon || Mount Lemmon Survey ||  || align=right | 1.8 km || 
|-id=135 bgcolor=#E9E9E9
| 559135 ||  || — || March 1, 2011 || Mayhill || N. Falla ||  || align=right | 1.9 km || 
|-id=136 bgcolor=#d6d6d6
| 559136 ||  || — || December 3, 2005 || Mauna Kea || Mauna Kea Obs. ||  || align=right | 1.7 km || 
|-id=137 bgcolor=#d6d6d6
| 559137 ||  || — || October 27, 2008 || Mount Lemmon || Mount Lemmon Survey ||  || align=right | 1.8 km || 
|-id=138 bgcolor=#d6d6d6
| 559138 ||  || — || September 25, 2008 || Kitt Peak || Spacewatch ||  || align=right | 1.7 km || 
|-id=139 bgcolor=#d6d6d6
| 559139 ||  || — || April 16, 2005 || Kitt Peak || Spacewatch ||  || align=right | 1.9 km || 
|-id=140 bgcolor=#d6d6d6
| 559140 ||  || — || August 17, 2012 || ESA OGS || ESA OGS ||  || align=right | 2.5 km || 
|-id=141 bgcolor=#d6d6d6
| 559141 ||  || — || September 10, 2007 || Mount Lemmon || Mount Lemmon Survey ||  || align=right | 2.2 km || 
|-id=142 bgcolor=#d6d6d6
| 559142 ||  || — || October 10, 2012 || Mount Lemmon || Mount Lemmon Survey ||  || align=right | 2.9 km || 
|-id=143 bgcolor=#d6d6d6
| 559143 ||  || — || October 28, 2013 || Mount Lemmon || Mount Lemmon Survey ||  || align=right | 2.1 km || 
|-id=144 bgcolor=#d6d6d6
| 559144 ||  || — || October 8, 2008 || Kitt Peak || Spacewatch ||  || align=right | 1.7 km || 
|-id=145 bgcolor=#d6d6d6
| 559145 ||  || — || October 23, 2013 || Mount Lemmon || Mount Lemmon Survey ||  || align=right | 1.7 km || 
|-id=146 bgcolor=#d6d6d6
| 559146 ||  || — || March 15, 2010 || Mount Lemmon || Mount Lemmon Survey ||  || align=right | 1.7 km || 
|-id=147 bgcolor=#d6d6d6
| 559147 ||  || — || September 22, 2012 || Mount Lemmon || Mount Lemmon Survey ||  || align=right | 2.4 km || 
|-id=148 bgcolor=#d6d6d6
| 559148 ||  || — || January 20, 2015 || Haleakala || Pan-STARRS ||  || align=right | 2.2 km || 
|-id=149 bgcolor=#d6d6d6
| 559149 ||  || — || November 10, 2013 || Mount Lemmon || Mount Lemmon Survey ||  || align=right | 2.7 km || 
|-id=150 bgcolor=#d6d6d6
| 559150 ||  || — || December 3, 2013 || Haleakala || Pan-STARRS ||  || align=right | 2.6 km || 
|-id=151 bgcolor=#d6d6d6
| 559151 ||  || — || March 18, 2010 || Mount Lemmon || Mount Lemmon Survey ||  || align=right | 2.3 km || 
|-id=152 bgcolor=#d6d6d6
| 559152 ||  || — || January 20, 2015 || Haleakala || Pan-STARRS ||  || align=right | 2.2 km || 
|-id=153 bgcolor=#d6d6d6
| 559153 ||  || — || October 9, 2013 || Mount Lemmon || Mount Lemmon Survey ||  || align=right | 2.3 km || 
|-id=154 bgcolor=#d6d6d6
| 559154 ||  || — || January 20, 2015 || Haleakala || Pan-STARRS ||  || align=right | 2.6 km || 
|-id=155 bgcolor=#d6d6d6
| 559155 ||  || — || January 20, 2015 || Haleakala || Pan-STARRS ||  || align=right | 1.9 km || 
|-id=156 bgcolor=#d6d6d6
| 559156 ||  || — || August 24, 2007 || Kitt Peak || Spacewatch ||  || align=right | 2.5 km || 
|-id=157 bgcolor=#d6d6d6
| 559157 ||  || — || October 8, 2007 || Mount Lemmon || Mount Lemmon Survey ||  || align=right | 2.0 km || 
|-id=158 bgcolor=#d6d6d6
| 559158 ||  || — || January 20, 2015 || Haleakala || Pan-STARRS ||  || align=right | 2.0 km || 
|-id=159 bgcolor=#d6d6d6
| 559159 ||  || — || October 9, 2013 || Oukaimeden || M. Ory ||  || align=right | 2.4 km || 
|-id=160 bgcolor=#d6d6d6
| 559160 ||  || — || October 2, 2008 || Mount Lemmon || Mount Lemmon Survey ||  || align=right | 1.9 km || 
|-id=161 bgcolor=#d6d6d6
| 559161 ||  || — || February 14, 2010 || Kitt Peak || Spacewatch ||  || align=right | 2.3 km || 
|-id=162 bgcolor=#d6d6d6
| 559162 ||  || — || August 16, 2001 || Palomar || NEAT || Tj (2.97) || align=right | 3.3 km || 
|-id=163 bgcolor=#d6d6d6
| 559163 ||  || — || November 27, 2013 || Haleakala || Pan-STARRS ||  || align=right | 2.6 km || 
|-id=164 bgcolor=#d6d6d6
| 559164 ||  || — || January 20, 2015 || Haleakala || Pan-STARRS ||  || align=right | 2.2 km || 
|-id=165 bgcolor=#d6d6d6
| 559165 ||  || — || January 20, 2015 || Haleakala || Pan-STARRS ||  || align=right | 2.0 km || 
|-id=166 bgcolor=#d6d6d6
| 559166 ||  || — || November 20, 2008 || Mount Lemmon || Mount Lemmon Survey ||  || align=right | 2.3 km || 
|-id=167 bgcolor=#d6d6d6
| 559167 ||  || — || September 23, 2008 || Mount Lemmon || Mount Lemmon Survey ||  || align=right | 2.0 km || 
|-id=168 bgcolor=#d6d6d6
| 559168 ||  || — || January 20, 2015 || Haleakala || Pan-STARRS ||  || align=right | 2.4 km || 
|-id=169 bgcolor=#d6d6d6
| 559169 ||  || — || October 8, 2008 || Mount Lemmon || Mount Lemmon Survey ||  || align=right | 1.8 km || 
|-id=170 bgcolor=#d6d6d6
| 559170 ||  || — || September 12, 2007 || Mount Lemmon || Mount Lemmon Survey ||  || align=right | 2.0 km || 
|-id=171 bgcolor=#fefefe
| 559171 ||  || — || January 15, 2015 || Mount Lemmon || Mount Lemmon Survey ||  || align=right data-sort-value="0.53" | 530 m || 
|-id=172 bgcolor=#d6d6d6
| 559172 ||  || — || January 17, 2004 || Kitt Peak || Spacewatch ||  || align=right | 3.8 km || 
|-id=173 bgcolor=#d6d6d6
| 559173 ||  || — || November 17, 1999 || Kitt Peak || Spacewatch ||  || align=right | 3.0 km || 
|-id=174 bgcolor=#d6d6d6
| 559174 ||  || — || November 9, 2008 || Mount Lemmon || Mount Lemmon Survey ||  || align=right | 2.7 km || 
|-id=175 bgcolor=#fefefe
| 559175 ||  || — || December 20, 2014 || Haleakala || Pan-STARRS || H || align=right data-sort-value="0.79" | 790 m || 
|-id=176 bgcolor=#C7FF8F
| 559176 ||  || — || January 27, 2015 || Haleakala || Pan-STARRS || centaur || align=right | 86 km || 
|-id=177 bgcolor=#C7FF8F
| 559177 ||  || — || January 19, 2015 || Haleakala || Pan-STARRS || centaurcritical || align=right | 46 km || 
|-id=178 bgcolor=#C2E0FF
| 559178 ||  || — || March 24, 2014 || Haleakala || Pan-STARRS || res3:4 || align=right | 225 km || 
|-id=179 bgcolor=#C2E0FF
| 559179 ||  || — || January 27, 2015 || Haleakala || Pan-STARRS || res4:7critical || align=right | 212 km || 
|-id=180 bgcolor=#C2E0FF
| 559180 ||  || — || April 10, 2013 || Haleakala || Pan-STARRS || cubewano (hot) || align=right | 290 km || 
|-id=181 bgcolor=#C2E0FF
| 559181 ||  || — || January 18, 2015 || Haleakala || Pan-STARRS || other TNOcritical || align=right | 335 km || 
|-id=182 bgcolor=#C2E0FF
| 559182 ||  || — || April 12, 2013 || Haleakala || Pan-STARRS || cubewano?critical || align=right | 484 km || 
|-id=183 bgcolor=#fefefe
| 559183 ||  || — || January 15, 2015 || Haleakala || Pan-STARRS || H || align=right data-sort-value="0.72" | 720 m || 
|-id=184 bgcolor=#fefefe
| 559184 ||  || — || January 23, 2015 || Haleakala || Pan-STARRS || H || align=right data-sort-value="0.58" | 580 m || 
|-id=185 bgcolor=#fefefe
| 559185 ||  || — || January 18, 2015 || Mount Lemmon || Mount Lemmon Survey || H || align=right data-sort-value="0.56" | 560 m || 
|-id=186 bgcolor=#fefefe
| 559186 ||  || — || January 19, 2015 || Mount Lemmon || Mount Lemmon Survey || H || align=right data-sort-value="0.57" | 570 m || 
|-id=187 bgcolor=#d6d6d6
| 559187 ||  || — || January 16, 2015 || Haleakala || Pan-STARRS ||  || align=right | 2.4 km || 
|-id=188 bgcolor=#d6d6d6
| 559188 ||  || — || January 18, 2015 || Haleakala || Pan-STARRS ||  || align=right | 3.3 km || 
|-id=189 bgcolor=#d6d6d6
| 559189 ||  || — || January 20, 2015 || Haleakala || Pan-STARRS ||  || align=right | 2.1 km || 
|-id=190 bgcolor=#d6d6d6
| 559190 ||  || — || January 20, 2015 || Haleakala || Pan-STARRS ||  || align=right | 2.1 km || 
|-id=191 bgcolor=#d6d6d6
| 559191 ||  || — || January 21, 2015 || Haleakala || Pan-STARRS ||  || align=right | 3.0 km || 
|-id=192 bgcolor=#d6d6d6
| 559192 ||  || — || January 21, 2015 || Haleakala || Pan-STARRS ||  || align=right | 2.2 km || 
|-id=193 bgcolor=#d6d6d6
| 559193 ||  || — || January 23, 2015 || Haleakala || Pan-STARRS ||  || align=right | 2.5 km || 
|-id=194 bgcolor=#d6d6d6
| 559194 ||  || — || September 5, 2002 || Socorro || LINEAR ||  || align=right | 2.7 km || 
|-id=195 bgcolor=#d6d6d6
| 559195 ||  || — || April 25, 2006 || Kitt Peak || Spacewatch ||  || align=right | 2.4 km || 
|-id=196 bgcolor=#d6d6d6
| 559196 ||  || — || October 15, 2002 || Palomar || NEAT ||  || align=right | 3.9 km || 
|-id=197 bgcolor=#d6d6d6
| 559197 ||  || — || January 26, 2015 || Mount Lemmon || Pan-STARRS ||  || align=right | 2.5 km || 
|-id=198 bgcolor=#d6d6d6
| 559198 ||  || — || November 13, 2002 || Kitt Peak || Spacewatch ||  || align=right | 2.0 km || 
|-id=199 bgcolor=#d6d6d6
| 559199 ||  || — || March 18, 2009 || Pla D'Arguines || R. Ferrando, C. Segarra ||  || align=right | 2.9 km || 
|-id=200 bgcolor=#d6d6d6
| 559200 ||  || — || January 17, 2015 || Mount Lemmon || Mount Lemmon Survey ||  || align=right | 2.1 km || 
|}

559201–559300 

|-bgcolor=#d6d6d6
| 559201 ||  || — || October 21, 2007 || Kitt Peak || Spacewatch ||  || align=right | 2.7 km || 
|-id=202 bgcolor=#d6d6d6
| 559202 ||  || — || May 21, 2011 || Mount Lemmon || Mount Lemmon Survey ||  || align=right | 1.9 km || 
|-id=203 bgcolor=#d6d6d6
| 559203 ||  || — || January 22, 2015 || Haleakala || Pan-STARRS ||  || align=right | 1.9 km || 
|-id=204 bgcolor=#d6d6d6
| 559204 ||  || — || September 15, 2007 || Kitt Peak || Spacewatch ||  || align=right | 2.1 km || 
|-id=205 bgcolor=#d6d6d6
| 559205 ||  || — || January 27, 2015 || Haleakala || Pan-STARRS ||  || align=right | 2.2 km || 
|-id=206 bgcolor=#d6d6d6
| 559206 ||  || — || November 16, 2012 || Haleakala || Pan-STARRS ||  || align=right | 2.9 km || 
|-id=207 bgcolor=#d6d6d6
| 559207 ||  || — || September 12, 2007 || Mount Lemmon || Mount Lemmon Survey ||  || align=right | 2.4 km || 
|-id=208 bgcolor=#d6d6d6
| 559208 ||  || — || January 22, 2015 || Haleakala || Pan-STARRS ||  || align=right | 2.8 km || 
|-id=209 bgcolor=#d6d6d6
| 559209 ||  || — || January 16, 2015 || Haleakala || Pan-STARRS ||  || align=right | 2.0 km || 
|-id=210 bgcolor=#d6d6d6
| 559210 ||  || — || September 24, 2008 || Mount Lemmon || Mount Lemmon Survey ||  || align=right | 2.4 km || 
|-id=211 bgcolor=#d6d6d6
| 559211 ||  || — || November 12, 2013 || Kitt Peak || Spacewatch ||  || align=right | 2.7 km || 
|-id=212 bgcolor=#d6d6d6
| 559212 ||  || — || December 22, 2008 || Mount Lemmon || Mount Lemmon Survey ||  || align=right | 3.2 km || 
|-id=213 bgcolor=#d6d6d6
| 559213 ||  || — || January 18, 2009 || Mount Lemmon || Mount Lemmon Survey ||  || align=right | 2.5 km || 
|-id=214 bgcolor=#d6d6d6
| 559214 ||  || — || October 10, 2012 || Haleakala || Pan-STARRS ||  || align=right | 2.9 km || 
|-id=215 bgcolor=#d6d6d6
| 559215 ||  || — || January 29, 2009 || Mount Lemmon || Mount Lemmon Survey ||  || align=right | 2.4 km || 
|-id=216 bgcolor=#d6d6d6
| 559216 ||  || — || January 27, 2015 || Haleakala || Pan-STARRS ||  || align=right | 2.3 km || 
|-id=217 bgcolor=#d6d6d6
| 559217 ||  || — || December 29, 2014 || Haleakala || Pan-STARRS ||  || align=right | 2.7 km || 
|-id=218 bgcolor=#d6d6d6
| 559218 ||  || — || October 23, 2008 || Kitt Peak || Spacewatch ||  || align=right | 1.9 km || 
|-id=219 bgcolor=#d6d6d6
| 559219 ||  || — || January 17, 2015 || Mount Lemmon || Mount Lemmon Survey ||  || align=right | 2.5 km || 
|-id=220 bgcolor=#d6d6d6
| 559220 ||  || — || January 16, 2015 || Mount Lemmon || Mount Lemmon Survey ||  || align=right | 2.5 km || 
|-id=221 bgcolor=#d6d6d6
| 559221 ||  || — || October 3, 2013 || Haleakala || Pan-STARRS ||  || align=right | 2.0 km || 
|-id=222 bgcolor=#d6d6d6
| 559222 ||  || — || September 14, 2013 || Haleakala || Pan-STARRS ||  || align=right | 2.0 km || 
|-id=223 bgcolor=#d6d6d6
| 559223 ||  || — || February 13, 2004 || Kitt Peak || Spacewatch ||  || align=right | 3.0 km || 
|-id=224 bgcolor=#d6d6d6
| 559224 ||  || — || December 17, 2009 || Kitt Peak || Spacewatch ||  || align=right | 2.5 km || 
|-id=225 bgcolor=#d6d6d6
| 559225 ||  || — || January 18, 2015 || Mount Lemmon || Mount Lemmon Survey ||  || align=right | 2.4 km || 
|-id=226 bgcolor=#d6d6d6
| 559226 ||  || — || December 1, 2008 || Mount Lemmon || Mount Lemmon Survey ||  || align=right | 2.7 km || 
|-id=227 bgcolor=#d6d6d6
| 559227 ||  || — || September 28, 2003 || Kitt Peak || Spacewatch ||  || align=right | 1.9 km || 
|-id=228 bgcolor=#E9E9E9
| 559228 ||  || — || January 30, 2011 || Mount Lemmon || Mount Lemmon Survey ||  || align=right | 2.0 km || 
|-id=229 bgcolor=#d6d6d6
| 559229 ||  || — || April 2, 2005 || Kitt Peak || Spacewatch ||  || align=right | 2.3 km || 
|-id=230 bgcolor=#d6d6d6
| 559230 ||  || — || August 26, 2012 || Haleakala || Pan-STARRS ||  || align=right | 1.9 km || 
|-id=231 bgcolor=#d6d6d6
| 559231 ||  || — || January 1, 2009 || Mount Lemmon || Mount Lemmon Survey ||  || align=right | 2.4 km || 
|-id=232 bgcolor=#d6d6d6
| 559232 ||  || — || January 16, 2015 || Haleakala || Pan-STARRS ||  || align=right | 2.5 km || 
|-id=233 bgcolor=#E9E9E9
| 559233 ||  || — || January 7, 2010 || Mount Lemmon || Mount Lemmon Survey ||  || align=right | 2.2 km || 
|-id=234 bgcolor=#d6d6d6
| 559234 ||  || — || March 30, 2000 || Kitt Peak || Spacewatch ||  || align=right | 2.8 km || 
|-id=235 bgcolor=#d6d6d6
| 559235 ||  || — || September 12, 2013 || Mount Lemmon || Mount Lemmon Survey ||  || align=right | 2.0 km || 
|-id=236 bgcolor=#d6d6d6
| 559236 ||  || — || January 30, 2004 || Kitt Peak || Spacewatch ||  || align=right | 2.9 km || 
|-id=237 bgcolor=#d6d6d6
| 559237 ||  || — || January 3, 2009 || Kitt Peak || Spacewatch ||  || align=right | 2.6 km || 
|-id=238 bgcolor=#d6d6d6
| 559238 ||  || — || September 29, 2008 || Mount Lemmon || Mount Lemmon Survey ||  || align=right | 2.1 km || 
|-id=239 bgcolor=#C7FF8F
| 559239 ||  || — || January 19, 2015 || Haleakala || Pan-STARRS || centaurcritical || align=right | 49 km || 
|-id=240 bgcolor=#d6d6d6
| 559240 ||  || — || January 21, 2015 || Haleakala || Pan-STARRS ||  || align=right | 2.1 km || 
|-id=241 bgcolor=#d6d6d6
| 559241 ||  || — || January 29, 2015 || Haleakala || Pan-STARRS ||  || align=right | 2.4 km || 
|-id=242 bgcolor=#d6d6d6
| 559242 ||  || — || January 20, 2015 || Haleakala || Pan-STARRS ||  || align=right | 2.2 km || 
|-id=243 bgcolor=#d6d6d6
| 559243 ||  || — || June 16, 2018 || Haleakala || Pan-STARRS ||  || align=right | 2.4 km || 
|-id=244 bgcolor=#E9E9E9
| 559244 ||  || — || March 5, 2016 || Haleakala || Pan-STARRS ||  || align=right | 1.6 km || 
|-id=245 bgcolor=#d6d6d6
| 559245 ||  || — || January 20, 2015 || Haleakala || Pan-STARRS ||  || align=right | 2.3 km || 
|-id=246 bgcolor=#d6d6d6
| 559246 ||  || — || January 18, 2015 || Mount Lemmon || Mount Lemmon Survey ||  || align=right | 2.5 km || 
|-id=247 bgcolor=#d6d6d6
| 559247 ||  || — || January 21, 2015 || Haleakala || Pan-STARRS ||  || align=right | 2.2 km || 
|-id=248 bgcolor=#d6d6d6
| 559248 ||  || — || January 22, 2015 || Haleakala || Pan-STARRS ||  || align=right | 2.1 km || 
|-id=249 bgcolor=#d6d6d6
| 559249 ||  || — || January 20, 2015 || Mount Lemmon || Mount Lemmon Survey ||  || align=right | 2.5 km || 
|-id=250 bgcolor=#d6d6d6
| 559250 ||  || — || January 18, 2015 || Kitt Peak || Spacewatch ||  || align=right | 2.1 km || 
|-id=251 bgcolor=#d6d6d6
| 559251 ||  || — || January 19, 2015 || Haleakala || Pan-STARRS ||  || align=right | 2.1 km || 
|-id=252 bgcolor=#d6d6d6
| 559252 ||  || — || January 18, 2015 || Mount Lemmon || Mount Lemmon Survey ||  || align=right | 2.0 km || 
|-id=253 bgcolor=#d6d6d6
| 559253 ||  || — || January 28, 2015 || Haleakala || Pan-STARRS ||  || align=right | 2.6 km || 
|-id=254 bgcolor=#d6d6d6
| 559254 ||  || — || January 27, 2015 || Haleakala || Pan-STARRS ||  || align=right | 2.4 km || 
|-id=255 bgcolor=#d6d6d6
| 559255 ||  || — || January 20, 2015 || Haleakala || Pan-STARRS ||  || align=right | 1.8 km || 
|-id=256 bgcolor=#d6d6d6
| 559256 ||  || — || January 27, 2015 || Haleakala || Pan-STARRS ||  || align=right | 2.5 km || 
|-id=257 bgcolor=#d6d6d6
| 559257 ||  || — || January 18, 2015 || Haleakala || Pan-STARRS ||  || align=right | 1.9 km || 
|-id=258 bgcolor=#d6d6d6
| 559258 ||  || — || January 17, 2015 || Haleakala || Pan-STARRS ||  || align=right | 2.9 km || 
|-id=259 bgcolor=#d6d6d6
| 559259 ||  || — || January 22, 2015 || Haleakala || Pan-STARRS ||  || align=right | 2.4 km || 
|-id=260 bgcolor=#d6d6d6
| 559260 ||  || — || January 17, 2015 || Haleakala || Pan-STARRS ||  || align=right | 2.0 km || 
|-id=261 bgcolor=#d6d6d6
| 559261 ||  || — || October 26, 2008 || Mount Lemmon || Mount Lemmon Survey ||  || align=right | 2.1 km || 
|-id=262 bgcolor=#d6d6d6
| 559262 ||  || — || January 20, 2015 || Mount Lemmon || Mount Lemmon Survey ||  || align=right | 2.1 km || 
|-id=263 bgcolor=#d6d6d6
| 559263 ||  || — || January 22, 2015 || Haleakala || Pan-STARRS ||  || align=right | 2.0 km || 
|-id=264 bgcolor=#d6d6d6
| 559264 ||  || — || January 21, 2015 || Haleakala || Pan-STARRS ||  || align=right | 1.6 km || 
|-id=265 bgcolor=#d6d6d6
| 559265 ||  || — || January 23, 2015 || Haleakala || Pan-STARRS ||  || align=right | 2.3 km || 
|-id=266 bgcolor=#d6d6d6
| 559266 ||  || — || January 26, 2015 || Haleakala || Pan-STARRS ||  || align=right | 1.6 km || 
|-id=267 bgcolor=#d6d6d6
| 559267 ||  || — || January 19, 2015 || Mount Lemmon || Mount Lemmon Survey ||  || align=right | 2.3 km || 
|-id=268 bgcolor=#d6d6d6
| 559268 ||  || — || October 20, 2003 || Kitt Peak || Spacewatch ||  || align=right | 2.1 km || 
|-id=269 bgcolor=#d6d6d6
| 559269 ||  || — || January 17, 2015 || Haleakala || Pan-STARRS ||  || align=right | 2.3 km || 
|-id=270 bgcolor=#d6d6d6
| 559270 ||  || — || January 28, 2004 || Kitt Peak || Spacewatch ||  || align=right | 2.1 km || 
|-id=271 bgcolor=#d6d6d6
| 559271 ||  || — || January 16, 2015 || Haleakala || Pan-STARRS ||  || align=right | 2.3 km || 
|-id=272 bgcolor=#d6d6d6
| 559272 ||  || — || October 10, 2012 || Mount Lemmon || Mount Lemmon Survey ||  || align=right | 2.2 km || 
|-id=273 bgcolor=#d6d6d6
| 559273 ||  || — || January 28, 2015 || Haleakala || Pan-STARRS ||  || align=right | 2.4 km || 
|-id=274 bgcolor=#d6d6d6
| 559274 ||  || — || January 27, 2015 || Haleakala || Pan-STARRS ||  || align=right | 2.7 km || 
|-id=275 bgcolor=#d6d6d6
| 559275 ||  || — || January 28, 2015 || Haleakala || Pan-STARRS ||  || align=right | 2.9 km || 
|-id=276 bgcolor=#d6d6d6
| 559276 ||  || — || January 18, 2015 || Haleakala || Pan-STARRS ||  || align=right | 2.2 km || 
|-id=277 bgcolor=#E9E9E9
| 559277 ||  || — || January 17, 2015 || Haleakala || Pan-STARRS ||  || align=right | 1.9 km || 
|-id=278 bgcolor=#d6d6d6
| 559278 ||  || — || January 21, 2015 || Haleakala || Pan-STARRS ||  || align=right | 2.3 km || 
|-id=279 bgcolor=#d6d6d6
| 559279 ||  || — || January 17, 2015 || Haleakala || Pan-STARRS ||  || align=right | 1.9 km || 
|-id=280 bgcolor=#d6d6d6
| 559280 ||  || — || January 20, 2015 || Mount Lemmon || Mount Lemmon Survey ||  || align=right | 2.2 km || 
|-id=281 bgcolor=#d6d6d6
| 559281 ||  || — || January 18, 2015 || Mount Lemmon || Mount Lemmon Survey ||  || align=right | 2.2 km || 
|-id=282 bgcolor=#d6d6d6
| 559282 ||  || — || January 17, 2015 || Mount Lemmon || Mount Lemmon Survey ||  || align=right | 2.5 km || 
|-id=283 bgcolor=#d6d6d6
| 559283 ||  || — || January 20, 2015 || Haleakala || Pan-STARRS ||  || align=right | 1.7 km || 
|-id=284 bgcolor=#d6d6d6
| 559284 ||  || — || January 27, 2015 || Haleakala || Pan-STARRS ||  || align=right | 2.1 km || 
|-id=285 bgcolor=#d6d6d6
| 559285 ||  || — || January 28, 2015 || Haleakala || Pan-STARRS ||  || align=right | 2.2 km || 
|-id=286 bgcolor=#d6d6d6
| 559286 ||  || — || January 26, 2015 || Haleakala || Pan-STARRS ||  || align=right | 2.6 km || 
|-id=287 bgcolor=#d6d6d6
| 559287 ||  || — || January 27, 2015 || Haleakala || Pan-STARRS ||  || align=right | 2.4 km || 
|-id=288 bgcolor=#d6d6d6
| 559288 ||  || — || January 28, 2015 || Haleakala || Pan-STARRS ||  || align=right | 2.7 km || 
|-id=289 bgcolor=#E9E9E9
| 559289 ||  || — || January 22, 2015 || Haleakala || Pan-STARRS ||  || align=right | 2.0 km || 
|-id=290 bgcolor=#d6d6d6
| 559290 ||  || — || January 17, 2015 || Haleakala || Pan-STARRS ||  || align=right | 2.5 km || 
|-id=291 bgcolor=#d6d6d6
| 559291 ||  || — || January 28, 2015 || Haleakala || Pan-STARRS ||  || align=right | 2.2 km || 
|-id=292 bgcolor=#C2FFFF
| 559292 ||  || — || January 28, 2015 || Haleakala || Pan-STARRS || L4 || align=right | 6.6 km || 
|-id=293 bgcolor=#fefefe
| 559293 ||  || — || June 8, 2003 || Kitt Peak || Spacewatch || H || align=right data-sort-value="0.67" | 670 m || 
|-id=294 bgcolor=#fefefe
| 559294 ||  || — || April 24, 2007 || Mount Lemmon || Mount Lemmon Survey ||  || align=right data-sort-value="0.64" | 640 m || 
|-id=295 bgcolor=#d6d6d6
| 559295 ||  || — || February 17, 2010 || Kitt Peak || Spacewatch ||  || align=right | 2.3 km || 
|-id=296 bgcolor=#d6d6d6
| 559296 ||  || — || February 14, 2004 || Kitt Peak || Spacewatch ||  || align=right | 2.1 km || 
|-id=297 bgcolor=#d6d6d6
| 559297 ||  || — || October 26, 2008 || Kitt Peak || Spacewatch ||  || align=right | 2.5 km || 
|-id=298 bgcolor=#d6d6d6
| 559298 ||  || — || February 16, 2004 || Kitt Peak || Spacewatch ||  || align=right | 2.2 km || 
|-id=299 bgcolor=#E9E9E9
| 559299 ||  || — || January 16, 2015 || Haleakala || Pan-STARRS ||  || align=right | 1.9 km || 
|-id=300 bgcolor=#d6d6d6
| 559300 ||  || — || September 14, 2013 || Haleakala || Pan-STARRS ||  || align=right | 2.6 km || 
|}

559301–559400 

|-bgcolor=#d6d6d6
| 559301 ||  || — || January 20, 2015 || Haleakala || Pan-STARRS ||  || align=right | 1.8 km || 
|-id=302 bgcolor=#fefefe
| 559302 ||  || — || February 6, 2007 || Kitt Peak || Spacewatch || H || align=right data-sort-value="0.57" | 570 m || 
|-id=303 bgcolor=#d6d6d6
| 559303 ||  || — || January 30, 2004 || Kitt Peak || Spacewatch ||  || align=right | 3.9 km || 
|-id=304 bgcolor=#d6d6d6
| 559304 ||  || — || October 26, 2008 || Mount Lemmon || Mount Lemmon Survey ||  || align=right | 2.2 km || 
|-id=305 bgcolor=#d6d6d6
| 559305 ||  || — || January 17, 2015 || Haleakala || Pan-STARRS ||  || align=right | 2.3 km || 
|-id=306 bgcolor=#d6d6d6
| 559306 ||  || — || November 3, 2003 || Apache Point || SDSS Collaboration ||  || align=right | 2.6 km || 
|-id=307 bgcolor=#d6d6d6
| 559307 ||  || — || January 16, 2015 || Haleakala || Pan-STARRS ||  || align=right | 3.2 km || 
|-id=308 bgcolor=#d6d6d6
| 559308 ||  || — || January 19, 2015 || Mount Lemmon || Mount Lemmon Survey ||  || align=right | 3.0 km || 
|-id=309 bgcolor=#fefefe
| 559309 ||  || — || April 26, 2010 || Palomar || Mount Lemmon Survey ||  || align=right data-sort-value="0.97" | 970 m || 
|-id=310 bgcolor=#d6d6d6
| 559310 ||  || — || January 16, 2004 || Kitt Peak || Spacewatch ||  || align=right | 1.9 km || 
|-id=311 bgcolor=#d6d6d6
| 559311 ||  || — || January 20, 2015 || Haleakala || Pan-STARRS ||  || align=right | 2.2 km || 
|-id=312 bgcolor=#d6d6d6
| 559312 ||  || — || November 2, 2013 || Mount Lemmon || Mount Lemmon Survey ||  || align=right | 2.9 km || 
|-id=313 bgcolor=#d6d6d6
| 559313 ||  || — || October 24, 2013 || Mount Lemmon || Mount Lemmon Survey ||  || align=right | 1.9 km || 
|-id=314 bgcolor=#d6d6d6
| 559314 ||  || — || February 11, 2004 || Kitt Peak || Spacewatch ||  || align=right | 3.8 km || 
|-id=315 bgcolor=#d6d6d6
| 559315 ||  || — || December 4, 2008 || Kitt Peak || Spacewatch ||  || align=right | 1.7 km || 
|-id=316 bgcolor=#d6d6d6
| 559316 ||  || — || February 9, 2015 || Mount Lemmon || Mount Lemmon Survey ||  || align=right | 2.7 km || 
|-id=317 bgcolor=#d6d6d6
| 559317 ||  || — || August 26, 2012 || Haleakala || Pan-STARRS ||  || align=right | 2.9 km || 
|-id=318 bgcolor=#d6d6d6
| 559318 ||  || — || January 17, 2004 || Palomar || NEAT ||  || align=right | 3.5 km || 
|-id=319 bgcolor=#d6d6d6
| 559319 ||  || — || January 21, 2015 || Haleakala || Pan-STARRS ||  || align=right | 3.0 km || 
|-id=320 bgcolor=#d6d6d6
| 559320 ||  || — || September 11, 2007 || Lulin || LUSS ||  || align=right | 3.1 km || 
|-id=321 bgcolor=#d6d6d6
| 559321 ||  || — || September 19, 2001 || Kitt Peak || Spacewatch ||  || align=right | 3.3 km || 
|-id=322 bgcolor=#d6d6d6
| 559322 ||  || — || November 26, 2014 || Haleakala || Pan-STARRS ||  || align=right | 2.8 km || 
|-id=323 bgcolor=#d6d6d6
| 559323 ||  || — || January 17, 2015 || Haleakala || Pan-STARRS ||  || align=right | 2.7 km || 
|-id=324 bgcolor=#d6d6d6
| 559324 ||  || — || September 16, 2013 || Mount Lemmon || Mount Lemmon Survey ||  || align=right | 3.0 km || 
|-id=325 bgcolor=#d6d6d6
| 559325 ||  || — || January 19, 2004 || Kitt Peak || Spacewatch ||  || align=right | 2.4 km || 
|-id=326 bgcolor=#d6d6d6
| 559326 ||  || — || January 21, 2015 || Kitt Peak || Spacewatch ||  || align=right | 2.5 km || 
|-id=327 bgcolor=#d6d6d6
| 559327 ||  || — || January 20, 2015 || Kitt Peak || Spacewatch ||  || align=right | 2.4 km || 
|-id=328 bgcolor=#d6d6d6
| 559328 ||  || — || November 1, 2013 || Mount Lemmon || Mount Lemmon Survey ||  || align=right | 2.1 km || 
|-id=329 bgcolor=#d6d6d6
| 559329 ||  || — || January 16, 2004 || Kitt Peak || Spacewatch ||  || align=right | 3.0 km || 
|-id=330 bgcolor=#d6d6d6
| 559330 ||  || — || August 25, 2012 || Kitt Peak || Spacewatch ||  || align=right | 2.5 km || 
|-id=331 bgcolor=#E9E9E9
| 559331 ||  || — || September 4, 2008 || Kitt Peak || Spacewatch ||  || align=right | 1.9 km || 
|-id=332 bgcolor=#d6d6d6
| 559332 ||  || — || September 16, 2012 || Mount Lemmon || Mount Lemmon Survey ||  || align=right | 2.8 km || 
|-id=333 bgcolor=#d6d6d6
| 559333 ||  || — || January 18, 2015 || Mount Lemmon || Mount Lemmon Survey ||  || align=right | 2.1 km || 
|-id=334 bgcolor=#d6d6d6
| 559334 ||  || — || December 4, 2008 || Kitt Peak || Spacewatch ||  || align=right | 2.8 km || 
|-id=335 bgcolor=#d6d6d6
| 559335 ||  || — || March 18, 2010 || Mount Lemmon || Mount Lemmon Survey ||  || align=right | 3.1 km || 
|-id=336 bgcolor=#d6d6d6
| 559336 ||  || — || November 12, 2013 || Kitt Peak || Spacewatch ||  || align=right | 2.3 km || 
|-id=337 bgcolor=#d6d6d6
| 559337 ||  || — || January 19, 2015 || Kitt Peak || Spacewatch ||  || align=right | 2.3 km || 
|-id=338 bgcolor=#d6d6d6
| 559338 ||  || — || November 2, 2008 || Mount Lemmon || Mount Lemmon Survey ||  || align=right | 1.9 km || 
|-id=339 bgcolor=#d6d6d6
| 559339 ||  || — || January 20, 2015 || Haleakala || Pan-STARRS ||  || align=right | 2.6 km || 
|-id=340 bgcolor=#d6d6d6
| 559340 ||  || — || September 13, 2007 || Mount Lemmon || Mount Lemmon Survey ||  || align=right | 2.6 km || 
|-id=341 bgcolor=#d6d6d6
| 559341 ||  || — || August 24, 2011 || Haleakala || Pan-STARRS ||  || align=right | 2.6 km || 
|-id=342 bgcolor=#d6d6d6
| 559342 ||  || — || November 20, 2008 || Kitt Peak || Spacewatch ||  || align=right | 1.9 km || 
|-id=343 bgcolor=#d6d6d6
| 559343 ||  || — || January 19, 2015 || Mount Lemmon || Mount Lemmon Survey ||  || align=right | 2.9 km || 
|-id=344 bgcolor=#d6d6d6
| 559344 ||  || — || February 1, 2009 || Mount Lemmon || Mount Lemmon Survey ||  || align=right | 2.5 km || 
|-id=345 bgcolor=#d6d6d6
| 559345 ||  || — || August 13, 2012 || Haleakala || Pan-STARRS ||  || align=right | 2.5 km || 
|-id=346 bgcolor=#d6d6d6
| 559346 ||  || — || August 11, 2012 || Mayhill-ISON || L. Elenin ||  || align=right | 2.4 km || 
|-id=347 bgcolor=#d6d6d6
| 559347 ||  || — || September 14, 2007 || Catalina || CSS ||  || align=right | 3.3 km || 
|-id=348 bgcolor=#d6d6d6
| 559348 ||  || — || February 9, 2010 || Kitt Peak || Spacewatch ||  || align=right | 2.1 km || 
|-id=349 bgcolor=#d6d6d6
| 559349 ||  || — || February 18, 2010 || Mount Lemmon || Mount Lemmon Survey ||  || align=right | 1.7 km || 
|-id=350 bgcolor=#d6d6d6
| 559350 ||  || — || November 3, 2008 || Kitt Peak || Spacewatch ||  || align=right | 1.9 km || 
|-id=351 bgcolor=#E9E9E9
| 559351 ||  || — || November 7, 2005 || Mauna Kea || Mauna Kea Obs. ||  || align=right | 2.0 km || 
|-id=352 bgcolor=#E9E9E9
| 559352 ||  || — || June 17, 2012 || Mount Lemmon || Mount Lemmon Survey ||  || align=right | 2.7 km || 
|-id=353 bgcolor=#d6d6d6
| 559353 ||  || — || February 13, 2010 || Kitt Peak || Spacewatch ||  || align=right | 3.1 km || 
|-id=354 bgcolor=#d6d6d6
| 559354 ||  || — || February 11, 2015 || Kitt Peak || Spacewatch || 7:4 || align=right | 3.2 km || 
|-id=355 bgcolor=#d6d6d6
| 559355 ||  || — || October 24, 2013 || Mount Lemmon || Mount Lemmon Survey ||  || align=right | 2.4 km || 
|-id=356 bgcolor=#E9E9E9
| 559356 ||  || — || March 10, 2011 || Kitt Peak || Spacewatch ||  || align=right | 2.0 km || 
|-id=357 bgcolor=#d6d6d6
| 559357 ||  || — || December 18, 2009 || Kitt Peak || Spacewatch ||  || align=right | 1.9 km || 
|-id=358 bgcolor=#d6d6d6
| 559358 ||  || — || September 26, 2008 || Kitt Peak || Spacewatch ||  || align=right | 3.2 km || 
|-id=359 bgcolor=#d6d6d6
| 559359 ||  || — || October 22, 2008 || Kitt Peak || Spacewatch ||  || align=right | 3.5 km || 
|-id=360 bgcolor=#d6d6d6
| 559360 ||  || — || February 12, 2015 || Haleakala || Pan-STARRS ||  || align=right | 2.4 km || 
|-id=361 bgcolor=#d6d6d6
| 559361 ||  || — || September 12, 2013 || Mount Lemmon || Mount Lemmon Survey ||  || align=right | 3.4 km || 
|-id=362 bgcolor=#d6d6d6
| 559362 ||  || — || February 11, 2004 || Palomar || NEAT ||  || align=right | 3.0 km || 
|-id=363 bgcolor=#E9E9E9
| 559363 ||  || — || December 25, 2005 || Kitt Peak || Spacewatch ||  || align=right | 1.7 km || 
|-id=364 bgcolor=#d6d6d6
| 559364 ||  || — || February 13, 2004 || Kitt Peak || Spacewatch ||  || align=right | 2.9 km || 
|-id=365 bgcolor=#d6d6d6
| 559365 ||  || — || October 11, 2007 || Mount Lemmon || Mount Lemmon Survey ||  || align=right | 3.0 km || 
|-id=366 bgcolor=#d6d6d6
| 559366 ||  || — || February 16, 2004 || Kitt Peak || Spacewatch ||  || align=right | 3.0 km || 
|-id=367 bgcolor=#d6d6d6
| 559367 ||  || — || November 21, 2008 || Kitt Peak || Spacewatch ||  || align=right | 2.9 km || 
|-id=368 bgcolor=#d6d6d6
| 559368 ||  || — || September 10, 2007 || Mount Lemmon || Mount Lemmon Survey ||  || align=right | 3.0 km || 
|-id=369 bgcolor=#d6d6d6
| 559369 ||  || — || September 29, 2008 || Mount Lemmon || Mount Lemmon Survey ||  || align=right | 2.7 km || 
|-id=370 bgcolor=#d6d6d6
| 559370 ||  || — || April 25, 2006 || Kitt Peak || Spacewatch ||  || align=right | 3.0 km || 
|-id=371 bgcolor=#d6d6d6
| 559371 ||  || — || February 5, 2002 || Anderson Mesa || LONEOS || 7:4 || align=right | 4.0 km || 
|-id=372 bgcolor=#d6d6d6
| 559372 ||  || — || February 13, 2005 || La Silla || A. Boattini ||  || align=right | 3.5 km || 
|-id=373 bgcolor=#d6d6d6
| 559373 ||  || — || October 24, 2013 || Mount Lemmon || Mount Lemmon Survey ||  || align=right | 2.0 km || 
|-id=374 bgcolor=#E9E9E9
| 559374 ||  || — || January 8, 2010 || Mount Lemmon || Mount Lemmon Survey ||  || align=right | 2.4 km || 
|-id=375 bgcolor=#d6d6d6
| 559375 ||  || — || February 12, 2015 || Haleakala || Pan-STARRS ||  || align=right | 2.5 km || 
|-id=376 bgcolor=#d6d6d6
| 559376 ||  || — || January 17, 2004 || Palomar || NEAT ||  || align=right | 3.3 km || 
|-id=377 bgcolor=#d6d6d6
| 559377 ||  || — || February 13, 2004 || Kitt Peak || Spacewatch ||  || align=right | 2.0 km || 
|-id=378 bgcolor=#d6d6d6
| 559378 ||  || — || February 15, 2010 || Kitt Peak || Spacewatch ||  || align=right | 2.8 km || 
|-id=379 bgcolor=#d6d6d6
| 559379 ||  || — || October 16, 2013 || Mount Lemmon || Mount Lemmon Survey ||  || align=right | 2.5 km || 
|-id=380 bgcolor=#d6d6d6
| 559380 ||  || — || January 21, 2015 || Haleakala || Pan-STARRS ||  || align=right | 2.5 km || 
|-id=381 bgcolor=#d6d6d6
| 559381 ||  || — || March 12, 2004 || Palomar || NEAT ||  || align=right | 2.6 km || 
|-id=382 bgcolor=#d6d6d6
| 559382 ||  || — || September 17, 2012 || Mount Lemmon || Mount Lemmon Survey ||  || align=right | 2.9 km || 
|-id=383 bgcolor=#d6d6d6
| 559383 ||  || — || August 10, 2007 || Kitt Peak || Spacewatch ||  || align=right | 2.3 km || 
|-id=384 bgcolor=#d6d6d6
| 559384 ||  || — || March 23, 2004 || Kitt Peak || Spacewatch ||  || align=right | 2.5 km || 
|-id=385 bgcolor=#d6d6d6
| 559385 ||  || — || August 24, 2011 || Haleakala || Pan-STARRS ||  || align=right | 3.0 km || 
|-id=386 bgcolor=#d6d6d6
| 559386 ||  || — || December 29, 2008 || Kitt Peak || Spacewatch ||  || align=right | 1.9 km || 
|-id=387 bgcolor=#d6d6d6
| 559387 ||  || — || August 28, 2006 || Kitt Peak || Spacewatch ||  || align=right | 3.2 km || 
|-id=388 bgcolor=#d6d6d6
| 559388 ||  || — || January 15, 2009 || Kitt Peak || Spacewatch ||  || align=right | 2.4 km || 
|-id=389 bgcolor=#d6d6d6
| 559389 ||  || — || January 15, 2009 || Kitt Peak || Spacewatch ||  || align=right | 2.4 km || 
|-id=390 bgcolor=#d6d6d6
| 559390 ||  || — || December 11, 2013 || Haleakala || Pan-STARRS ||  || align=right | 2.5 km || 
|-id=391 bgcolor=#d6d6d6
| 559391 ||  || — || December 31, 2008 || Kitt Peak || Spacewatch || 7:4* || align=right | 2.4 km || 
|-id=392 bgcolor=#d6d6d6
| 559392 ||  || — || February 15, 2015 || Haleakala || Pan-STARRS ||  || align=right | 3.1 km || 
|-id=393 bgcolor=#d6d6d6
| 559393 ||  || — || July 4, 2005 || Palomar || NEAT ||  || align=right | 4.3 km || 
|-id=394 bgcolor=#d6d6d6
| 559394 ||  || — || October 24, 2003 || Apache Point || SDSS Collaboration ||  || align=right | 2.1 km || 
|-id=395 bgcolor=#d6d6d6
| 559395 ||  || — || January 16, 2015 || Haleakala || Pan-STARRS ||  || align=right | 2.7 km || 
|-id=396 bgcolor=#d6d6d6
| 559396 ||  || — || October 3, 2013 || Kitt Peak || Spacewatch ||  || align=right | 2.9 km || 
|-id=397 bgcolor=#d6d6d6
| 559397 ||  || — || February 10, 2015 || Mount Lemmon || Mount Lemmon Survey ||  || align=right | 2.7 km || 
|-id=398 bgcolor=#d6d6d6
| 559398 ||  || — || January 19, 2015 || Kitt Peak || Mount Lemmon Survey ||  || align=right | 2.0 km || 
|-id=399 bgcolor=#d6d6d6
| 559399 ||  || — || February 11, 2015 || Mount Lemmon || Mount Lemmon Survey ||  || align=right | 1.7 km || 
|-id=400 bgcolor=#d6d6d6
| 559400 ||  || — || January 15, 2004 || Kitt Peak || Spacewatch ||  || align=right | 2.4 km || 
|}

559401–559500 

|-bgcolor=#d6d6d6
| 559401 ||  || — || December 25, 2008 || Bergisch Gladbach || W. Bickel ||  || align=right | 2.5 km || 
|-id=402 bgcolor=#d6d6d6
| 559402 ||  || — || March 11, 2005 || Mount Lemmon || Mount Lemmon Survey ||  || align=right | 2.7 km || 
|-id=403 bgcolor=#d6d6d6
| 559403 ||  || — || April 10, 2010 || Mount Lemmon || Mount Lemmon Survey ||  || align=right | 2.2 km || 
|-id=404 bgcolor=#d6d6d6
| 559404 ||  || — || September 11, 2007 || Mount Lemmon || Mount Lemmon Survey ||  || align=right | 2.5 km || 
|-id=405 bgcolor=#d6d6d6
| 559405 ||  || — || March 18, 2010 || Mount Lemmon || Mount Lemmon Survey ||  || align=right | 2.8 km || 
|-id=406 bgcolor=#d6d6d6
| 559406 ||  || — || October 23, 2001 || Palomar || NEAT ||  || align=right | 3.5 km || 
|-id=407 bgcolor=#d6d6d6
| 559407 ||  || — || November 20, 2014 || Mount Lemmon || Mount Lemmon Survey ||  || align=right | 2.2 km || 
|-id=408 bgcolor=#d6d6d6
| 559408 ||  || — || February 14, 2010 || Mount Lemmon || Mount Lemmon Survey ||  || align=right | 2.5 km || 
|-id=409 bgcolor=#d6d6d6
| 559409 ||  || — || April 8, 2010 || Kitt Peak || Spacewatch ||  || align=right | 2.6 km || 
|-id=410 bgcolor=#d6d6d6
| 559410 ||  || — || January 23, 2015 || Haleakala || Pan-STARRS ||  || align=right | 2.4 km || 
|-id=411 bgcolor=#d6d6d6
| 559411 ||  || — || February 14, 2015 || Mount Lemmon || Mount Lemmon Survey ||  || align=right | 2.7 km || 
|-id=412 bgcolor=#fefefe
| 559412 ||  || — || February 1, 2015 || Haleakala || Pan-STARRS || H || align=right data-sort-value="0.58" | 580 m || 
|-id=413 bgcolor=#d6d6d6
| 559413 ||  || — || December 31, 2008 || Mount Lemmon || Mount Lemmon Survey ||  || align=right | 2.5 km || 
|-id=414 bgcolor=#d6d6d6
| 559414 ||  || — || February 12, 2015 || Haleakala || Pan-STARRS ||  || align=right | 1.9 km || 
|-id=415 bgcolor=#d6d6d6
| 559415 ||  || — || February 9, 2015 || Mount Lemmon || Mount Lemmon Survey ||  || align=right | 2.1 km || 
|-id=416 bgcolor=#d6d6d6
| 559416 ||  || — || February 8, 2015 || Mount Lemmon || Mount Lemmon Survey ||  || align=right | 2.5 km || 
|-id=417 bgcolor=#d6d6d6
| 559417 ||  || — || January 16, 2015 || Haleakala || Pan-STARRS ||  || align=right | 2.5 km || 
|-id=418 bgcolor=#d6d6d6
| 559418 ||  || — || February 16, 2015 || Haleakala || Pan-STARRS ||  || align=right | 1.7 km || 
|-id=419 bgcolor=#E9E9E9
| 559419 ||  || — || February 13, 2011 || Mount Lemmon || Mount Lemmon Survey ||  || align=right | 1.5 km || 
|-id=420 bgcolor=#d6d6d6
| 559420 ||  || — || February 16, 2010 || Mount Lemmon || Mount Lemmon Survey ||  || align=right | 1.7 km || 
|-id=421 bgcolor=#d6d6d6
| 559421 ||  || — || October 30, 2008 || Kitt Peak || Spacewatch ||  || align=right | 2.5 km || 
|-id=422 bgcolor=#d6d6d6
| 559422 ||  || — || December 20, 2009 || Kitt Peak || Spacewatch ||  || align=right | 1.9 km || 
|-id=423 bgcolor=#d6d6d6
| 559423 ||  || — || January 16, 2015 || Haleakala || Pan-STARRS ||  || align=right | 1.8 km || 
|-id=424 bgcolor=#d6d6d6
| 559424 ||  || — || January 24, 2015 || Haleakala || Pan-STARRS ||  || align=right | 2.2 km || 
|-id=425 bgcolor=#d6d6d6
| 559425 ||  || — || September 27, 2003 || Kitt Peak || Spacewatch ||  || align=right | 2.2 km || 
|-id=426 bgcolor=#d6d6d6
| 559426 ||  || — || October 8, 2007 || Anderson Mesa || LONEOS ||  || align=right | 3.5 km || 
|-id=427 bgcolor=#d6d6d6
| 559427 ||  || — || December 26, 2014 || Haleakala || Pan-STARRS ||  || align=right | 2.3 km || 
|-id=428 bgcolor=#E9E9E9
| 559428 ||  || — || February 24, 2006 || Kitt Peak || Spacewatch ||  || align=right | 2.5 km || 
|-id=429 bgcolor=#d6d6d6
| 559429 ||  || — || November 11, 2013 || Mount Lemmon || Mount Lemmon Survey ||  || align=right | 2.4 km || 
|-id=430 bgcolor=#d6d6d6
| 559430 ||  || — || February 8, 2015 || Mount Lemmon || Mount Lemmon Survey ||  || align=right | 2.0 km || 
|-id=431 bgcolor=#d6d6d6
| 559431 ||  || — || April 10, 2005 || Mount Lemmon || Mount Lemmon Survey ||  || align=right | 2.1 km || 
|-id=432 bgcolor=#d6d6d6
| 559432 ||  || — || December 21, 2014 || Mount Lemmon || Mount Lemmon Survey ||  || align=right | 2.2 km || 
|-id=433 bgcolor=#d6d6d6
| 559433 ||  || — || August 13, 2012 || Siding Spring || SSS ||  || align=right | 2.7 km || 
|-id=434 bgcolor=#d6d6d6
| 559434 ||  || — || January 14, 2015 || Haleakala || Pan-STARRS ||  || align=right | 2.8 km || 
|-id=435 bgcolor=#d6d6d6
| 559435 ||  || — || October 23, 2008 || Kitt Peak || Spacewatch ||  || align=right | 2.1 km || 
|-id=436 bgcolor=#d6d6d6
| 559436 ||  || — || August 26, 2012 || Haleakala || Pan-STARRS ||  || align=right | 2.4 km || 
|-id=437 bgcolor=#d6d6d6
| 559437 ||  || — || January 8, 2010 || Kitt Peak || Spacewatch ||  || align=right | 2.3 km || 
|-id=438 bgcolor=#d6d6d6
| 559438 ||  || — || January 11, 2010 || Kitt Peak || Spacewatch ||  || align=right | 2.5 km || 
|-id=439 bgcolor=#d6d6d6
| 559439 ||  || — || January 20, 2015 || Haleakala || Pan-STARRS ||  || align=right | 1.9 km || 
|-id=440 bgcolor=#d6d6d6
| 559440 ||  || — || August 14, 2012 || Haleakala || Pan-STARRS ||  || align=right | 2.6 km || 
|-id=441 bgcolor=#d6d6d6
| 559441 ||  || — || September 26, 2003 || Apache Point || SDSS Collaboration ||  || align=right | 2.0 km || 
|-id=442 bgcolor=#d6d6d6
| 559442 ||  || — || October 3, 2013 || Mount Lemmon || Mount Lemmon Survey ||  || align=right | 1.9 km || 
|-id=443 bgcolor=#d6d6d6
| 559443 ||  || — || February 16, 2010 || Kitt Peak || Spacewatch ||  || align=right | 2.5 km || 
|-id=444 bgcolor=#d6d6d6
| 559444 ||  || — || January 14, 2015 || Haleakala || Pan-STARRS ||  || align=right | 2.3 km || 
|-id=445 bgcolor=#E9E9E9
| 559445 ||  || — || February 4, 2006 || Kitt Peak || Spacewatch ||  || align=right | 1.9 km || 
|-id=446 bgcolor=#d6d6d6
| 559446 ||  || — || December 2, 2005 || Anderson Mesa || Mauna Kea Obs. ||  || align=right | 2.4 km || 
|-id=447 bgcolor=#d6d6d6
| 559447 ||  || — || February 16, 2004 || Kitt Peak || Spacewatch ||  || align=right | 2.4 km || 
|-id=448 bgcolor=#d6d6d6
| 559448 ||  || — || January 27, 2015 || Haleakala || Pan-STARRS ||  || align=right | 2.3 km || 
|-id=449 bgcolor=#d6d6d6
| 559449 ||  || — || April 6, 2010 || Mount Lemmon || Mount Lemmon Survey ||  || align=right | 2.6 km || 
|-id=450 bgcolor=#fefefe
| 559450 ||  || — || May 21, 2012 || Haleakala || Pan-STARRS ||  || align=right data-sort-value="0.64" | 640 m || 
|-id=451 bgcolor=#d6d6d6
| 559451 ||  || — || January 28, 2004 || Kitt Peak || Spacewatch ||  || align=right | 2.6 km || 
|-id=452 bgcolor=#d6d6d6
| 559452 ||  || — || February 16, 2015 || Haleakala || Pan-STARRS ||  || align=right | 2.9 km || 
|-id=453 bgcolor=#d6d6d6
| 559453 ||  || — || January 27, 2015 || Haleakala || Pan-STARRS ||  || align=right | 2.5 km || 
|-id=454 bgcolor=#d6d6d6
| 559454 ||  || — || November 28, 2013 || Mount Lemmon || Mount Lemmon Survey ||  || align=right | 1.8 km || 
|-id=455 bgcolor=#d6d6d6
| 559455 ||  || — || January 24, 2015 || Mount Lemmon || Mount Lemmon Survey ||  || align=right | 2.4 km || 
|-id=456 bgcolor=#d6d6d6
| 559456 ||  || — || September 10, 2007 || Mount Lemmon || Mount Lemmon Survey || Tj (2.98) || align=right | 2.5 km || 
|-id=457 bgcolor=#d6d6d6
| 559457 ||  || — || November 19, 2008 || Catalina || CSS ||  || align=right | 2.2 km || 
|-id=458 bgcolor=#d6d6d6
| 559458 ||  || — || August 14, 2012 || Haleakala || Pan-STARRS ||  || align=right | 2.2 km || 
|-id=459 bgcolor=#d6d6d6
| 559459 ||  || — || February 15, 2010 || Kitt Peak || Spacewatch ||  || align=right | 2.4 km || 
|-id=460 bgcolor=#d6d6d6
| 559460 ||  || — || November 9, 2013 || Haleakala || Pan-STARRS ||  || align=right | 2.1 km || 
|-id=461 bgcolor=#d6d6d6
| 559461 ||  || — || September 13, 2007 || Saint-Sulpice || B. Christophe ||  || align=right | 2.1 km || 
|-id=462 bgcolor=#d6d6d6
| 559462 ||  || — || January 21, 2015 || Haleakala || Pan-STARRS ||  || align=right | 2.0 km || 
|-id=463 bgcolor=#d6d6d6
| 559463 ||  || — || February 16, 2015 || Haleakala || Pan-STARRS ||  || align=right | 2.7 km || 
|-id=464 bgcolor=#d6d6d6
| 559464 ||  || — || January 27, 2015 || Haleakala || Pan-STARRS ||  || align=right | 3.3 km || 
|-id=465 bgcolor=#d6d6d6
| 559465 ||  || — || October 8, 2007 || Mount Lemmon || Mount Lemmon Survey ||  || align=right | 2.6 km || 
|-id=466 bgcolor=#fefefe
| 559466 ||  || — || March 23, 2012 || Kitt Peak || Spacewatch ||  || align=right data-sort-value="0.58" | 580 m || 
|-id=467 bgcolor=#d6d6d6
| 559467 ||  || — || October 7, 2002 || Palomar || NEAT ||  || align=right | 2.7 km || 
|-id=468 bgcolor=#d6d6d6
| 559468 ||  || — || February 16, 2015 || Haleakala || Pan-STARRS ||  || align=right | 2.6 km || 
|-id=469 bgcolor=#d6d6d6
| 559469 ||  || — || September 11, 2007 || Mount Lemmon || Mount Lemmon Survey ||  || align=right | 2.3 km || 
|-id=470 bgcolor=#E9E9E9
| 559470 ||  || — || January 12, 2010 || Mount Lemmon || Mount Lemmon Survey ||  || align=right | 2.0 km || 
|-id=471 bgcolor=#d6d6d6
| 559471 ||  || — || November 10, 2013 || Mount Lemmon || Mount Lemmon Survey ||  || align=right | 2.0 km || 
|-id=472 bgcolor=#d6d6d6
| 559472 ||  || — || August 17, 2012 || Haleakala || Pan-STARRS ||  || align=right | 2.5 km || 
|-id=473 bgcolor=#d6d6d6
| 559473 ||  || — || January 21, 2015 || Haleakala || Pan-STARRS ||  || align=right | 2.4 km || 
|-id=474 bgcolor=#d6d6d6
| 559474 ||  || — || August 17, 2012 || Haleakala || Pan-STARRS ||  || align=right | 2.7 km || 
|-id=475 bgcolor=#d6d6d6
| 559475 ||  || — || January 17, 2004 || Palomar || NEAT ||  || align=right | 2.7 km || 
|-id=476 bgcolor=#d6d6d6
| 559476 ||  || — || January 25, 2009 || Kitt Peak || Spacewatch ||  || align=right | 2.6 km || 
|-id=477 bgcolor=#d6d6d6
| 559477 ||  || — || February 3, 2009 || Mount Lemmon || Mount Lemmon Survey ||  || align=right | 2.5 km || 
|-id=478 bgcolor=#d6d6d6
| 559478 ||  || — || February 16, 2015 || Haleakala || Pan-STARRS ||  || align=right | 2.5 km || 
|-id=479 bgcolor=#d6d6d6
| 559479 ||  || — || November 26, 2013 || Haleakala || Pan-STARRS ||  || align=right | 2.2 km || 
|-id=480 bgcolor=#d6d6d6
| 559480 ||  || — || June 22, 2011 || Mount Lemmon || Mount Lemmon Survey ||  || align=right | 3.1 km || 
|-id=481 bgcolor=#d6d6d6
| 559481 ||  || — || November 12, 2001 || Apache Point || SDSS Collaboration ||  || align=right | 2.5 km || 
|-id=482 bgcolor=#d6d6d6
| 559482 ||  || — || October 19, 2007 || Kitt Peak || Spacewatch ||  || align=right | 2.6 km || 
|-id=483 bgcolor=#d6d6d6
| 559483 ||  || — || May 7, 2010 || Mount Lemmon || Mount Lemmon Survey ||  || align=right | 2.1 km || 
|-id=484 bgcolor=#d6d6d6
| 559484 ||  || — || September 13, 2007 || Mount Lemmon || Mount Lemmon Survey ||  || align=right | 2.8 km || 
|-id=485 bgcolor=#d6d6d6
| 559485 ||  || — || January 15, 2009 || Kitt Peak || Spacewatch ||  || align=right | 2.2 km || 
|-id=486 bgcolor=#d6d6d6
| 559486 ||  || — || September 18, 2001 || Kitt Peak || SDSS ||  || align=right | 3.1 km || 
|-id=487 bgcolor=#d6d6d6
| 559487 ||  || — || March 17, 2004 || Kitt Peak || Spacewatch ||  || align=right | 2.3 km || 
|-id=488 bgcolor=#d6d6d6
| 559488 ||  || — || November 29, 2013 || Mount Lemmon || Mount Lemmon Survey ||  || align=right | 2.2 km || 
|-id=489 bgcolor=#d6d6d6
| 559489 ||  || — || October 15, 2007 || Kitt Peak || Spacewatch ||  || align=right | 2.8 km || 
|-id=490 bgcolor=#d6d6d6
| 559490 ||  || — || January 28, 2015 || Haleakala || Pan-STARRS ||  || align=right | 2.9 km || 
|-id=491 bgcolor=#d6d6d6
| 559491 ||  || — || May 13, 2005 || Kitt Peak || Spacewatch ||  || align=right | 2.6 km || 
|-id=492 bgcolor=#d6d6d6
| 559492 ||  || — || January 28, 2015 || Haleakala || Pan-STARRS ||  || align=right | 2.4 km || 
|-id=493 bgcolor=#d6d6d6
| 559493 ||  || — || January 27, 2015 || Haleakala || Pan-STARRS ||  || align=right | 2.2 km || 
|-id=494 bgcolor=#d6d6d6
| 559494 ||  || — || November 11, 2013 || Kitt Peak || Spacewatch ||  || align=right | 2.1 km || 
|-id=495 bgcolor=#d6d6d6
| 559495 ||  || — || April 14, 2010 || Mount Lemmon || Mount Lemmon Survey ||  || align=right | 2.6 km || 
|-id=496 bgcolor=#d6d6d6
| 559496 ||  || — || December 22, 2008 || Mount Lemmon || Mount Lemmon Survey ||  || align=right | 2.5 km || 
|-id=497 bgcolor=#d6d6d6
| 559497 ||  || — || February 2, 2009 || Mount Lemmon || Mount Lemmon Survey ||  || align=right | 2.3 km || 
|-id=498 bgcolor=#d6d6d6
| 559498 ||  || — || January 29, 2015 || Haleakala || Pan-STARRS ||  || align=right | 2.4 km || 
|-id=499 bgcolor=#d6d6d6
| 559499 ||  || — || September 10, 2007 || Kitt Peak || Spacewatch ||  || align=right | 2.2 km || 
|-id=500 bgcolor=#d6d6d6
| 559500 ||  || — || January 30, 2009 || Mount Lemmon || Mount Lemmon Survey ||  || align=right | 2.1 km || 
|}

559501–559600 

|-bgcolor=#d6d6d6
| 559501 ||  || — || October 10, 2007 || Kitt Peak || Spacewatch ||  || align=right | 2.8 km || 
|-id=502 bgcolor=#d6d6d6
| 559502 ||  || — || January 27, 2015 || Haleakala || Pan-STARRS ||  || align=right | 1.9 km || 
|-id=503 bgcolor=#d6d6d6
| 559503 ||  || — || January 27, 2015 || Haleakala || Pan-STARRS ||  || align=right | 2.4 km || 
|-id=504 bgcolor=#d6d6d6
| 559504 ||  || — || October 16, 2007 || Kitt Peak || Spacewatch ||  || align=right | 2.1 km || 
|-id=505 bgcolor=#d6d6d6
| 559505 ||  || — || November 9, 2013 || Mount Lemmon || Mount Lemmon Survey ||  || align=right | 2.0 km || 
|-id=506 bgcolor=#d6d6d6
| 559506 ||  || — || March 13, 2010 || Mount Lemmon || Mount Lemmon Survey ||  || align=right | 1.9 km || 
|-id=507 bgcolor=#d6d6d6
| 559507 ||  || — || April 25, 2004 || Kitt Peak || Spacewatch ||  || align=right | 2.4 km || 
|-id=508 bgcolor=#d6d6d6
| 559508 ||  || — || November 12, 2013 || Mount Lemmon || Mount Lemmon Survey ||  || align=right | 2.2 km || 
|-id=509 bgcolor=#d6d6d6
| 559509 ||  || — || April 11, 2005 || Kitt Peak || Spacewatch ||  || align=right | 1.9 km || 
|-id=510 bgcolor=#d6d6d6
| 559510 ||  || — || August 17, 2012 || Haleakala || Pan-STARRS ||  || align=right | 2.1 km || 
|-id=511 bgcolor=#d6d6d6
| 559511 ||  || — || August 17, 2012 || Haleakala || Pan-STARRS ||  || align=right | 2.1 km || 
|-id=512 bgcolor=#d6d6d6
| 559512 ||  || — || March 18, 2010 || Mount Lemmon || Mount Lemmon Survey ||  || align=right | 3.0 km || 
|-id=513 bgcolor=#d6d6d6
| 559513 ||  || — || October 25, 2001 || Mount Lemmon || SDSS ||  || align=right | 3.6 km || 
|-id=514 bgcolor=#d6d6d6
| 559514 ||  || — || September 29, 2013 || Haleakala || Pan-STARRS ||  || align=right | 2.9 km || 
|-id=515 bgcolor=#d6d6d6
| 559515 ||  || — || January 16, 2015 || Haleakala || Pan-STARRS ||  || align=right | 1.9 km || 
|-id=516 bgcolor=#d6d6d6
| 559516 ||  || — || February 16, 2015 || Haleakala || Pan-STARRS ||  || align=right | 2.0 km || 
|-id=517 bgcolor=#d6d6d6
| 559517 ||  || — || October 6, 2013 || Kitt Peak || Spacewatch ||  || align=right | 2.2 km || 
|-id=518 bgcolor=#d6d6d6
| 559518 ||  || — || January 22, 2015 || Haleakala || Pan-STARRS ||  || align=right | 2.5 km || 
|-id=519 bgcolor=#d6d6d6
| 559519 ||  || — || September 16, 2012 || Nogales || M. Schwartz, P. R. Holvorcem ||  || align=right | 2.7 km || 
|-id=520 bgcolor=#d6d6d6
| 559520 ||  || — || December 7, 2013 || Kitt Peak || Spacewatch ||  || align=right | 2.4 km || 
|-id=521 bgcolor=#d6d6d6
| 559521 Sonbird ||  ||  || September 8, 2012 || Tincana || M. Żołnowski, M. Kusiak ||  || align=right | 2.7 km || 
|-id=522 bgcolor=#d6d6d6
| 559522 ||  || — || January 22, 2015 || Haleakala || Pan-STARRS ||  || align=right | 1.9 km || 
|-id=523 bgcolor=#d6d6d6
| 559523 ||  || — || January 22, 2015 || Haleakala || Pan-STARRS ||  || align=right | 2.7 km || 
|-id=524 bgcolor=#d6d6d6
| 559524 ||  || — || November 4, 2013 || Haleakala || Pan-STARRS ||  || align=right | 2.3 km || 
|-id=525 bgcolor=#d6d6d6
| 559525 ||  || — || February 16, 2015 || Haleakala || Pan-STARRS ||  || align=right | 2.2 km || 
|-id=526 bgcolor=#d6d6d6
| 559526 ||  || — || October 1, 2013 || Kitt Peak || Spacewatch ||  || align=right | 2.3 km || 
|-id=527 bgcolor=#d6d6d6
| 559527 ||  || — || September 26, 2013 || Mount Lemmon || Mount Lemmon Survey ||  || align=right | 2.6 km || 
|-id=528 bgcolor=#d6d6d6
| 559528 ||  || — || April 5, 2005 || Mount Lemmon || Mount Lemmon Survey ||  || align=right | 1.9 km || 
|-id=529 bgcolor=#d6d6d6
| 559529 ||  || — || March 13, 2010 || Mount Lemmon || Mount Lemmon Survey ||  || align=right | 2.0 km || 
|-id=530 bgcolor=#d6d6d6
| 559530 ||  || — || November 28, 2013 || Haleakala || Pan-STARRS ||  || align=right | 2.6 km || 
|-id=531 bgcolor=#d6d6d6
| 559531 ||  || — || February 16, 2015 || Haleakala || Pan-STARRS ||  || align=right | 2.1 km || 
|-id=532 bgcolor=#d6d6d6
| 559532 ||  || — || August 19, 2006 || Kitt Peak || Spacewatch ||  || align=right | 3.0 km || 
|-id=533 bgcolor=#d6d6d6
| 559533 ||  || — || August 6, 2012 || Haleakala || Pan-STARRS ||  || align=right | 2.5 km || 
|-id=534 bgcolor=#d6d6d6
| 559534 ||  || — || January 16, 2015 || Haleakala || Pan-STARRS ||  || align=right | 2.7 km || 
|-id=535 bgcolor=#d6d6d6
| 559535 ||  || — || August 9, 2007 || Kitt Peak || Spacewatch ||  || align=right | 3.0 km || 
|-id=536 bgcolor=#d6d6d6
| 559536 ||  || — || April 4, 2005 || Catalina || CSS ||  || align=right | 3.2 km || 
|-id=537 bgcolor=#d6d6d6
| 559537 ||  || — || January 18, 2015 || Haleakala || Pan-STARRS ||  || align=right | 2.5 km || 
|-id=538 bgcolor=#d6d6d6
| 559538 ||  || — || March 13, 2010 || Kitt Peak || Spacewatch ||  || align=right | 2.0 km || 
|-id=539 bgcolor=#d6d6d6
| 559539 ||  || — || September 11, 2007 || Mount Lemmon || Mount Lemmon Survey ||  || align=right | 2.2 km || 
|-id=540 bgcolor=#d6d6d6
| 559540 ||  || — || August 26, 2012 || Haleakala || Pan-STARRS ||  || align=right | 2.6 km || 
|-id=541 bgcolor=#d6d6d6
| 559541 ||  || — || October 3, 2013 || Kitt Peak || Spacewatch ||  || align=right | 2.2 km || 
|-id=542 bgcolor=#d6d6d6
| 559542 ||  || — || July 21, 2006 || Mount Lemmon || Mount Lemmon Survey ||  || align=right | 3.0 km || 
|-id=543 bgcolor=#d6d6d6
| 559543 ||  || — || March 25, 2010 || Kitt Peak || Spacewatch ||  || align=right | 2.0 km || 
|-id=544 bgcolor=#d6d6d6
| 559544 ||  || — || January 22, 2015 || Haleakala || Pan-STARRS ||  || align=right | 2.0 km || 
|-id=545 bgcolor=#d6d6d6
| 559545 ||  || — || January 22, 2015 || Haleakala || Pan-STARRS ||  || align=right | 2.1 km || 
|-id=546 bgcolor=#E9E9E9
| 559546 ||  || — || September 20, 2008 || Siding Spring || SSS ||  || align=right | 1.8 km || 
|-id=547 bgcolor=#d6d6d6
| 559547 ||  || — || February 16, 2015 || Haleakala || Pan-STARRS ||  || align=right | 2.6 km || 
|-id=548 bgcolor=#d6d6d6
| 559548 ||  || — || October 12, 2007 || Kitt Peak || Spacewatch ||  || align=right | 2.7 km || 
|-id=549 bgcolor=#d6d6d6
| 559549 ||  || — || January 27, 2015 || Haleakala || Pan-STARRS ||  || align=right | 2.3 km || 
|-id=550 bgcolor=#d6d6d6
| 559550 ||  || — || December 7, 2013 || Kitt Peak || Spacewatch ||  || align=right | 2.3 km || 
|-id=551 bgcolor=#d6d6d6
| 559551 ||  || — || September 17, 2012 || Mount Lemmon || Mount Lemmon Survey ||  || align=right | 2.5 km || 
|-id=552 bgcolor=#d6d6d6
| 559552 ||  || — || September 30, 2013 || Catalina || CSS ||  || align=right | 2.7 km || 
|-id=553 bgcolor=#d6d6d6
| 559553 ||  || — || August 14, 2012 || Haleakala || Pan-STARRS ||  || align=right | 2.8 km || 
|-id=554 bgcolor=#d6d6d6
| 559554 ||  || — || June 21, 2012 || Kitt Peak || Spacewatch ||  || align=right | 2.3 km || 
|-id=555 bgcolor=#d6d6d6
| 559555 ||  || — || February 27, 2004 || Kitt Peak || M. W. Buie, D. E. Trilling ||  || align=right | 2.5 km || 
|-id=556 bgcolor=#d6d6d6
| 559556 ||  || — || September 12, 2007 || Mount Lemmon || Mount Lemmon Survey ||  || align=right | 2.1 km || 
|-id=557 bgcolor=#d6d6d6
| 559557 ||  || — || August 26, 2012 || Haleakala || Pan-STARRS ||  || align=right | 2.2 km || 
|-id=558 bgcolor=#d6d6d6
| 559558 ||  || — || August 17, 2012 || Haleakala || Pan-STARRS ||  || align=right | 2.1 km || 
|-id=559 bgcolor=#d6d6d6
| 559559 ||  || — || September 13, 2007 || Mount Lemmon || Mount Lemmon Survey ||  || align=right | 2.2 km || 
|-id=560 bgcolor=#d6d6d6
| 559560 ||  || — || September 19, 2007 || Kitt Peak || Spacewatch ||  || align=right | 3.0 km || 
|-id=561 bgcolor=#d6d6d6
| 559561 ||  || — || April 12, 2005 || Kitt Peak || Kitt Peak Obs. ||  || align=right | 2.4 km || 
|-id=562 bgcolor=#d6d6d6
| 559562 ||  || — || October 4, 2002 || Palomar || NEAT ||  || align=right | 2.5 km || 
|-id=563 bgcolor=#d6d6d6
| 559563 ||  || — || January 16, 2015 || Haleakala || Pan-STARRS ||  || align=right | 2.6 km || 
|-id=564 bgcolor=#d6d6d6
| 559564 ||  || — || September 25, 2012 || Kitt Peak || Spacewatch ||  || align=right | 2.6 km || 
|-id=565 bgcolor=#d6d6d6
| 559565 ||  || — || May 10, 2005 || Bergisch Gladbach || W. Bickel ||  || align=right | 3.1 km || 
|-id=566 bgcolor=#d6d6d6
| 559566 ||  || — || January 21, 2015 || Haleakala || Pan-STARRS ||  || align=right | 2.6 km || 
|-id=567 bgcolor=#d6d6d6
| 559567 ||  || — || January 22, 2015 || Haleakala || Pan-STARRS ||  || align=right | 1.8 km || 
|-id=568 bgcolor=#d6d6d6
| 559568 ||  || — || September 14, 2007 || Mount Lemmon || Mount Lemmon Survey ||  || align=right | 2.4 km || 
|-id=569 bgcolor=#d6d6d6
| 559569 ||  || — || December 7, 2013 || Haleakala || Pan-STARRS ||  || align=right | 2.4 km || 
|-id=570 bgcolor=#d6d6d6
| 559570 ||  || — || March 15, 2004 || Kitt Peak || Spacewatch ||  || align=right | 2.0 km || 
|-id=571 bgcolor=#d6d6d6
| 559571 ||  || — || January 26, 2009 || Mount Lemmon || Mount Lemmon Survey ||  || align=right | 2.1 km || 
|-id=572 bgcolor=#d6d6d6
| 559572 ||  || — || January 18, 2009 || Kitt Peak || Spacewatch ||  || align=right | 2.2 km || 
|-id=573 bgcolor=#d6d6d6
| 559573 ||  || — || September 17, 2012 || Mount Lemmon || Mount Lemmon Survey ||  || align=right | 2.7 km || 
|-id=574 bgcolor=#d6d6d6
| 559574 ||  || — || January 21, 2015 || Haleakala || Pan-STARRS ||  || align=right | 2.5 km || 
|-id=575 bgcolor=#d6d6d6
| 559575 ||  || — || October 12, 2007 || Mount Lemmon || Mount Lemmon Survey ||  || align=right | 2.8 km || 
|-id=576 bgcolor=#d6d6d6
| 559576 ||  || — || December 2, 2008 || Mount Lemmon || Mount Lemmon Survey ||  || align=right | 2.4 km || 
|-id=577 bgcolor=#d6d6d6
| 559577 ||  || — || March 29, 2011 || Kitt Peak || Spacewatch ||  || align=right | 2.8 km || 
|-id=578 bgcolor=#d6d6d6
| 559578 ||  || — || December 5, 2008 || Kitt Peak || Spacewatch ||  || align=right | 2.4 km || 
|-id=579 bgcolor=#d6d6d6
| 559579 ||  || — || September 22, 2003 || Kitt Peak || Spacewatch ||  || align=right | 2.3 km || 
|-id=580 bgcolor=#d6d6d6
| 559580 ||  || — || October 14, 2013 || Mount Lemmon || Mount Lemmon Survey ||  || align=right | 2.7 km || 
|-id=581 bgcolor=#d6d6d6
| 559581 ||  || — || February 11, 2004 || Palomar || NEAT ||  || align=right | 3.0 km || 
|-id=582 bgcolor=#d6d6d6
| 559582 ||  || — || November 9, 2013 || Haleakala || Pan-STARRS ||  || align=right | 3.6 km || 
|-id=583 bgcolor=#d6d6d6
| 559583 ||  || — || November 1, 2013 || Kitt Peak || Spacewatch ||  || align=right | 2.5 km || 
|-id=584 bgcolor=#d6d6d6
| 559584 ||  || — || March 12, 2010 || Kitt Peak || Spacewatch ||  || align=right | 2.8 km || 
|-id=585 bgcolor=#d6d6d6
| 559585 ||  || — || November 3, 2008 || Mount Lemmon || Mount Lemmon Survey ||  || align=right | 2.4 km || 
|-id=586 bgcolor=#d6d6d6
| 559586 ||  || — || October 25, 2013 || Mount Lemmon || Mount Lemmon Survey ||  || align=right | 2.8 km || 
|-id=587 bgcolor=#d6d6d6
| 559587 ||  || — || October 12, 2007 || Catalina || CSS ||  || align=right | 3.2 km || 
|-id=588 bgcolor=#d6d6d6
| 559588 ||  || — || October 24, 2013 || Mount Lemmon || Mount Lemmon Survey ||  || align=right | 2.3 km || 
|-id=589 bgcolor=#d6d6d6
| 559589 ||  || — || November 9, 2013 || Mount Lemmon || Mount Lemmon Survey ||  || align=right | 2.4 km || 
|-id=590 bgcolor=#d6d6d6
| 559590 ||  || — || October 26, 2013 || Catalina || CSS ||  || align=right | 2.7 km || 
|-id=591 bgcolor=#d6d6d6
| 559591 ||  || — || November 4, 2013 || Haleakala || Pan-STARRS ||  || align=right | 2.8 km || 
|-id=592 bgcolor=#d6d6d6
| 559592 ||  || — || September 29, 2008 || Mount Lemmon || Mount Lemmon Survey ||  || align=right | 2.4 km || 
|-id=593 bgcolor=#d6d6d6
| 559593 ||  || — || April 6, 2011 || Mount Lemmon || Mount Lemmon Survey ||  || align=right | 2.6 km || 
|-id=594 bgcolor=#d6d6d6
| 559594 ||  || — || January 29, 2015 || Haleakala || Pan-STARRS ||  || align=right | 2.1 km || 
|-id=595 bgcolor=#d6d6d6
| 559595 ||  || — || January 31, 2004 || Apache Point || SDSS Collaboration ||  || align=right | 2.7 km || 
|-id=596 bgcolor=#d6d6d6
| 559596 ||  || — || November 1, 2008 || Mount Lemmon || Mount Lemmon Survey ||  || align=right | 3.6 km || 
|-id=597 bgcolor=#d6d6d6
| 559597 ||  || — || October 4, 2013 || Kitt Peak || Spacewatch ||  || align=right | 2.0 km || 
|-id=598 bgcolor=#d6d6d6
| 559598 ||  || — || September 12, 2007 || Catalina || CSS ||  || align=right | 2.8 km || 
|-id=599 bgcolor=#d6d6d6
| 559599 ||  || — || September 14, 2013 || Mount Lemmon || Mount Lemmon Survey ||  || align=right | 3.2 km || 
|-id=600 bgcolor=#d6d6d6
| 559600 ||  || — || October 26, 2001 || Kitt Peak || Spacewatch ||  || align=right | 3.5 km || 
|}

559601–559700 

|-bgcolor=#d6d6d6
| 559601 ||  || — || November 1, 2013 || Kitt Peak || Spacewatch ||  || align=right | 2.9 km || 
|-id=602 bgcolor=#d6d6d6
| 559602 ||  || — || January 15, 2015 || Haleakala || Pan-STARRS ||  || align=right | 2.5 km || 
|-id=603 bgcolor=#d6d6d6
| 559603 ||  || — || October 22, 2008 || Kitt Peak || Spacewatch ||  || align=right | 2.4 km || 
|-id=604 bgcolor=#d6d6d6
| 559604 ||  || — || October 26, 2013 || Mount Lemmon || Mount Lemmon Survey ||  || align=right | 2.6 km || 
|-id=605 bgcolor=#d6d6d6
| 559605 ||  || — || March 26, 2004 || Kitt Peak || Spacewatch ||  || align=right | 2.9 km || 
|-id=606 bgcolor=#d6d6d6
| 559606 ||  || — || January 27, 2015 || Haleakala || Pan-STARRS ||  || align=right | 2.4 km || 
|-id=607 bgcolor=#d6d6d6
| 559607 ||  || — || May 12, 2011 || Mount Lemmon || Mount Lemmon Survey ||  || align=right | 4.4 km || 
|-id=608 bgcolor=#d6d6d6
| 559608 ||  || — || October 7, 2008 || Mount Lemmon || Mount Lemmon Survey ||  || align=right | 2.4 km || 
|-id=609 bgcolor=#d6d6d6
| 559609 ||  || — || January 20, 2015 || Mount Lemmon || Mount Lemmon Survey ||  || align=right | 2.5 km || 
|-id=610 bgcolor=#d6d6d6
| 559610 ||  || — || October 30, 2013 || Haleakala || Pan-STARRS ||  || align=right | 2.3 km || 
|-id=611 bgcolor=#d6d6d6
| 559611 ||  || — || January 18, 2004 || Catalina || CSS || EOS || align=right | 2.7 km || 
|-id=612 bgcolor=#d6d6d6
| 559612 ||  || — || January 29, 2015 || Haleakala || Pan-STARRS ||  || align=right | 2.3 km || 
|-id=613 bgcolor=#d6d6d6
| 559613 ||  || — || April 15, 2010 || Palomar || PTF ||  || align=right | 3.4 km || 
|-id=614 bgcolor=#d6d6d6
| 559614 ||  || — || September 10, 2007 || Kitt Peak || Spacewatch ||  || align=right | 3.0 km || 
|-id=615 bgcolor=#d6d6d6
| 559615 ||  || — || October 1, 2013 || Kitt Peak || Spacewatch ||  || align=right | 2.4 km || 
|-id=616 bgcolor=#d6d6d6
| 559616 ||  || — || October 6, 2013 || Kitt Peak || Spacewatch ||  || align=right | 2.5 km || 
|-id=617 bgcolor=#d6d6d6
| 559617 ||  || — || April 13, 2010 || Mount Lemmon || Mount Lemmon Survey ||  || align=right | 2.3 km || 
|-id=618 bgcolor=#d6d6d6
| 559618 ||  || — || December 4, 2007 || Mount Lemmon || Mount Lemmon Survey ||  || align=right | 3.4 km || 
|-id=619 bgcolor=#d6d6d6
| 559619 ||  || — || October 21, 2012 || Haleakala || Pan-STARRS ||  || align=right | 3.1 km || 
|-id=620 bgcolor=#d6d6d6
| 559620 ||  || — || November 19, 2007 || Kitt Peak || Spacewatch ||  || align=right | 3.0 km || 
|-id=621 bgcolor=#d6d6d6
| 559621 ||  || — || January 28, 2015 || Haleakala || Pan-STARRS ||  || align=right | 2.7 km || 
|-id=622 bgcolor=#d6d6d6
| 559622 ||  || — || November 28, 2013 || Mount Lemmon || Mount Lemmon Survey ||  || align=right | 2.3 km || 
|-id=623 bgcolor=#d6d6d6
| 559623 ||  || — || October 10, 2007 || Kitt Peak || Spacewatch ||  || align=right | 2.5 km || 
|-id=624 bgcolor=#d6d6d6
| 559624 ||  || — || December 18, 2007 || Mount Lemmon || Mount Lemmon Survey ||  || align=right | 2.8 km || 
|-id=625 bgcolor=#d6d6d6
| 559625 ||  || — || November 9, 2007 || Kitt Peak || Spacewatch ||  || align=right | 3.1 km || 
|-id=626 bgcolor=#d6d6d6
| 559626 ||  || — || December 1, 2008 || Mount Lemmon || Mount Lemmon Survey ||  || align=right | 2.6 km || 
|-id=627 bgcolor=#d6d6d6
| 559627 ||  || — || February 17, 2015 || Haleakala || Pan-STARRS ||  || align=right | 2.3 km || 
|-id=628 bgcolor=#d6d6d6
| 559628 ||  || — || October 8, 2012 || Haleakala || Pan-STARRS ||  || align=right | 2.6 km || 
|-id=629 bgcolor=#d6d6d6
| 559629 ||  || — || February 17, 2015 || Haleakala || Pan-STARRS ||  || align=right | 2.5 km || 
|-id=630 bgcolor=#d6d6d6
| 559630 ||  || — || December 29, 2014 || Haleakala || Pan-STARRS ||  || align=right | 3.0 km || 
|-id=631 bgcolor=#d6d6d6
| 559631 ||  || — || November 2, 2002 || La Palma || La Palma Obs. ||  || align=right | 2.9 km || 
|-id=632 bgcolor=#d6d6d6
| 559632 ||  || — || May 4, 2000 || Apache Point || SDSS Collaboration ||  || align=right | 2.7 km || 
|-id=633 bgcolor=#d6d6d6
| 559633 ||  || — || September 23, 2011 || Haleakala || Pan-STARRS ||  || align=right | 4.0 km || 
|-id=634 bgcolor=#d6d6d6
| 559634 ||  || — || October 28, 2013 || Kitt Peak || Spacewatch ||  || align=right | 2.7 km || 
|-id=635 bgcolor=#d6d6d6
| 559635 ||  || — || October 14, 2001 || Apache Point || SDSS Collaboration ||  || align=right | 2.8 km || 
|-id=636 bgcolor=#d6d6d6
| 559636 ||  || — || December 29, 2014 || Haleakala || Pan-STARRS ||  || align=right | 2.2 km || 
|-id=637 bgcolor=#d6d6d6
| 559637 ||  || — || January 19, 2015 || Haleakala || Pan-STARRS ||  || align=right | 2.9 km || 
|-id=638 bgcolor=#d6d6d6
| 559638 ||  || — || October 7, 2007 || Mount Lemmon || Mount Lemmon Survey ||  || align=right | 2.7 km || 
|-id=639 bgcolor=#d6d6d6
| 559639 ||  || — || October 17, 2012 || Haleakala || Pan-STARRS ||  || align=right | 2.8 km || 
|-id=640 bgcolor=#d6d6d6
| 559640 ||  || — || January 21, 2015 || Haleakala || Pan-STARRS ||  || align=right | 2.7 km || 
|-id=641 bgcolor=#d6d6d6
| 559641 ||  || — || April 14, 2010 || Kitt Peak || Spacewatch ||  || align=right | 2.3 km || 
|-id=642 bgcolor=#d6d6d6
| 559642 ||  || — || December 31, 2013 || Mount Lemmon || Mount Lemmon Survey ||  || align=right | 2.9 km || 
|-id=643 bgcolor=#d6d6d6
| 559643 ||  || — || January 28, 2015 || Haleakala || Pan-STARRS ||  || align=right | 2.6 km || 
|-id=644 bgcolor=#d6d6d6
| 559644 ||  || — || April 9, 2010 || Kitt Peak || Spacewatch ||  || align=right | 2.4 km || 
|-id=645 bgcolor=#d6d6d6
| 559645 ||  || — || November 14, 2007 || Kitt Peak || Spacewatch ||  || align=right | 2.9 km || 
|-id=646 bgcolor=#d6d6d6
| 559646 ||  || — || December 16, 2007 || Mount Lemmon || Mount Lemmon Survey ||  || align=right | 3.3 km || 
|-id=647 bgcolor=#d6d6d6
| 559647 ||  || — || December 29, 2014 || Haleakala || Pan-STARRS ||  || align=right | 2.7 km || 
|-id=648 bgcolor=#d6d6d6
| 559648 ||  || — || December 29, 2014 || Haleakala || Pan-STARRS ||  || align=right | 3.0 km || 
|-id=649 bgcolor=#d6d6d6
| 559649 ||  || — || December 11, 2013 || Mount Lemmon || Mount Lemmon Survey ||  || align=right | 2.5 km || 
|-id=650 bgcolor=#d6d6d6
| 559650 ||  || — || January 28, 2015 || Haleakala || Pan-STARRS ||  || align=right | 2.6 km || 
|-id=651 bgcolor=#d6d6d6
| 559651 ||  || — || October 6, 2013 || Mount Lemmon || Mount Lemmon Survey ||  || align=right | 2.2 km || 
|-id=652 bgcolor=#d6d6d6
| 559652 ||  || — || January 28, 2015 || Haleakala || Pan-STARRS ||  || align=right | 2.4 km || 
|-id=653 bgcolor=#d6d6d6
| 559653 ||  || — || January 28, 2015 || Haleakala || Pan-STARRS ||  || align=right | 2.6 km || 
|-id=654 bgcolor=#d6d6d6
| 559654 ||  || — || November 29, 2013 || Mount Lemmon || Mount Lemmon Survey ||  || align=right | 2.8 km || 
|-id=655 bgcolor=#d6d6d6
| 559655 ||  || — || November 20, 2001 || Cima Ekar || Asiago Obs. ||  || align=right | 2.8 km || 
|-id=656 bgcolor=#d6d6d6
| 559656 ||  || — || December 11, 2013 || Nogales || M. Schwartz, P. R. Holvorcem ||  || align=right | 3.4 km || 
|-id=657 bgcolor=#d6d6d6
| 559657 ||  || — || January 16, 2009 || Kitt Peak || Spacewatch ||  || align=right | 2.3 km || 
|-id=658 bgcolor=#d6d6d6
| 559658 ||  || — || September 11, 2007 || Kitt Peak || Spacewatch ||  || align=right | 3.2 km || 
|-id=659 bgcolor=#d6d6d6
| 559659 ||  || — || January 21, 2014 || Mount Lemmon || Mount Lemmon Survey ||  || align=right | 2.5 km || 
|-id=660 bgcolor=#d6d6d6
| 559660 ||  || — || August 10, 2005 || Siding Spring || SSS ||  || align=right | 4.9 km || 
|-id=661 bgcolor=#d6d6d6
| 559661 ||  || — || February 17, 2015 || Haleakala || Pan-STARRS ||  || align=right | 3.2 km || 
|-id=662 bgcolor=#d6d6d6
| 559662 ||  || — || February 17, 2015 || Haleakala || Pan-STARRS ||  || align=right | 2.9 km || 
|-id=663 bgcolor=#C2FFFF
| 559663 ||  || — || December 1, 2010 || Mount Lemmon || Mount Lemmon Survey || L4 || align=right | 8.4 km || 
|-id=664 bgcolor=#d6d6d6
| 559664 ||  || — || November 13, 2007 || Mount Lemmon || Mount Lemmon Survey ||  || align=right | 3.4 km || 
|-id=665 bgcolor=#d6d6d6
| 559665 ||  || — || January 20, 2015 || Haleakala || Pan-STARRS ||  || align=right | 1.6 km || 
|-id=666 bgcolor=#d6d6d6
| 559666 ||  || — || October 7, 2013 || Nogales || M. Schwartz, P. R. Holvorcem || EOS || align=right | 2.1 km || 
|-id=667 bgcolor=#d6d6d6
| 559667 ||  || — || January 15, 2015 || Haleakala || Pan-STARRS ||  || align=right | 2.0 km || 
|-id=668 bgcolor=#d6d6d6
| 559668 ||  || — || February 16, 2010 || Mount Lemmon || Mount Lemmon Survey ||  || align=right | 2.1 km || 
|-id=669 bgcolor=#d6d6d6
| 559669 ||  || — || February 17, 2010 || Kitt Peak || Spacewatch ||  || align=right | 2.7 km || 
|-id=670 bgcolor=#E9E9E9
| 559670 ||  || — || January 30, 2011 || Haleakala || Pan-STARRS ||  || align=right | 2.1 km || 
|-id=671 bgcolor=#d6d6d6
| 559671 ||  || — || February 9, 2005 || Mount Lemmon || Mount Lemmon Survey ||  || align=right | 3.0 km || 
|-id=672 bgcolor=#d6d6d6
| 559672 ||  || — || January 18, 2015 || Mount Lemmon || Mount Lemmon Survey ||  || align=right | 2.6 km || 
|-id=673 bgcolor=#fefefe
| 559673 ||  || — || February 16, 2002 || Palomar || NEAT || H || align=right data-sort-value="0.64" | 640 m || 
|-id=674 bgcolor=#d6d6d6
| 559674 ||  || — || October 25, 2008 || Kitt Peak || Spacewatch || EOS || align=right | 1.7 km || 
|-id=675 bgcolor=#d6d6d6
| 559675 ||  || — || April 29, 2011 || Mount Lemmon || Mount Lemmon Survey ||  || align=right | 3.1 km || 
|-id=676 bgcolor=#d6d6d6
| 559676 ||  || — || November 29, 2014 || Haleakala || Pan-STARRS ||  || align=right | 2.5 km || 
|-id=677 bgcolor=#d6d6d6
| 559677 ||  || — || September 13, 2007 || Mount Lemmon || Mount Lemmon Survey ||  || align=right | 2.5 km || 
|-id=678 bgcolor=#d6d6d6
| 559678 ||  || — || May 8, 2005 || Mount Lemmon || Mount Lemmon Survey ||  || align=right | 2.0 km || 
|-id=679 bgcolor=#d6d6d6
| 559679 ||  || — || December 23, 2014 || Kitt Peak || Spacewatch ||  || align=right | 2.7 km || 
|-id=680 bgcolor=#d6d6d6
| 559680 ||  || — || July 27, 1995 || Kitt Peak || Spacewatch ||  || align=right | 3.7 km || 
|-id=681 bgcolor=#d6d6d6
| 559681 ||  || — || August 17, 2012 || ESA OGS || ESA OGS ||  || align=right | 2.4 km || 
|-id=682 bgcolor=#d6d6d6
| 559682 ||  || — || January 11, 2010 || Kitt Peak || Spacewatch ||  || align=right | 2.0 km || 
|-id=683 bgcolor=#d6d6d6
| 559683 ||  || — || January 18, 2015 || Kitt Peak || Spacewatch ||  || align=right | 2.5 km || 
|-id=684 bgcolor=#d6d6d6
| 559684 ||  || — || November 11, 2013 || Kitt Peak || Spacewatch ||  || align=right | 2.7 km || 
|-id=685 bgcolor=#d6d6d6
| 559685 ||  || — || November 29, 2014 || Haleakala || Pan-STARRS ||  || align=right | 3.0 km || 
|-id=686 bgcolor=#d6d6d6
| 559686 ||  || — || May 27, 2011 || Kitt Peak || Spacewatch ||  || align=right | 2.9 km || 
|-id=687 bgcolor=#d6d6d6
| 559687 ||  || — || September 24, 2007 || Kitt Peak || Spacewatch ||  || align=right | 3.6 km || 
|-id=688 bgcolor=#d6d6d6
| 559688 ||  || — || November 20, 2008 || Kitt Peak || Spacewatch ||  || align=right | 3.6 km || 
|-id=689 bgcolor=#d6d6d6
| 559689 ||  || — || October 3, 2013 || Mount Lemmon || Mount Lemmon Survey || EOS || align=right | 1.9 km || 
|-id=690 bgcolor=#E9E9E9
| 559690 ||  || — || September 20, 2003 || Palomar || NEAT ||  || align=right | 2.7 km || 
|-id=691 bgcolor=#d6d6d6
| 559691 ||  || — || October 17, 2012 || Kitt Peak || Pan-STARRS ||  || align=right | 2.8 km || 
|-id=692 bgcolor=#d6d6d6
| 559692 ||  || — || November 24, 2002 || Palomar || NEAT || HYG || align=right | 3.4 km || 
|-id=693 bgcolor=#E9E9E9
| 559693 ||  || — || April 18, 2007 || Kitt Peak || Spacewatch ||  || align=right | 2.5 km || 
|-id=694 bgcolor=#d6d6d6
| 559694 ||  || — || April 10, 2005 || Mount Lemmon || Mount Lemmon Survey ||  || align=right | 2.6 km || 
|-id=695 bgcolor=#d6d6d6
| 559695 ||  || — || March 15, 2010 || Mount Lemmon || Mount Lemmon Survey ||  || align=right | 2.0 km || 
|-id=696 bgcolor=#d6d6d6
| 559696 ||  || — || November 10, 2013 || Mount Lemmon || Mount Lemmon Survey ||  || align=right | 2.4 km || 
|-id=697 bgcolor=#d6d6d6
| 559697 ||  || — || October 25, 2008 || Kitt Peak || Spacewatch ||  || align=right | 2.8 km || 
|-id=698 bgcolor=#d6d6d6
| 559698 ||  || — || September 14, 2012 || Catalina || CSS ||  || align=right | 3.0 km || 
|-id=699 bgcolor=#E9E9E9
| 559699 ||  || — || November 2, 2008 || Mount Lemmon || Mount Lemmon Survey ||  || align=right | 1.9 km || 
|-id=700 bgcolor=#d6d6d6
| 559700 ||  || — || March 17, 2004 || Kitt Peak || Spacewatch ||  || align=right | 3.1 km || 
|}

559701–559800 

|-bgcolor=#d6d6d6
| 559701 ||  || — || October 26, 2013 || Kitt Peak || Spacewatch ||  || align=right | 2.4 km || 
|-id=702 bgcolor=#d6d6d6
| 559702 ||  || — || March 18, 2010 || Mount Lemmon || Mount Lemmon Survey ||  || align=right | 2.5 km || 
|-id=703 bgcolor=#d6d6d6
| 559703 ||  || — || March 18, 2010 || Kitt Peak || Spacewatch ||  || align=right | 2.3 km || 
|-id=704 bgcolor=#d6d6d6
| 559704 ||  || — || January 20, 2009 || Catalina || CSS ||  || align=right | 2.4 km || 
|-id=705 bgcolor=#d6d6d6
| 559705 ||  || — || July 28, 2011 || Haleakala || Pan-STARRS ||  || align=right | 2.8 km || 
|-id=706 bgcolor=#d6d6d6
| 559706 ||  || — || February 18, 2015 || Haleakala || Pan-STARRS ||  || align=right | 2.3 km || 
|-id=707 bgcolor=#d6d6d6
| 559707 ||  || — || February 18, 2015 || Haleakala || Pan-STARRS ||  || align=right | 2.1 km || 
|-id=708 bgcolor=#d6d6d6
| 559708 ||  || — || October 15, 2007 || Kitt Peak || Spacewatch ||  || align=right | 2.4 km || 
|-id=709 bgcolor=#d6d6d6
| 559709 ||  || — || September 17, 2012 || Mount Lemmon || Mount Lemmon Survey ||  || align=right | 2.4 km || 
|-id=710 bgcolor=#d6d6d6
| 559710 ||  || — || January 21, 2015 || Haleakala || Pan-STARRS ||  || align=right | 2.7 km || 
|-id=711 bgcolor=#d6d6d6
| 559711 ||  || — || January 25, 2015 || Mount Lemmon || Pan-STARRS ||  || align=right | 2.8 km || 
|-id=712 bgcolor=#d6d6d6
| 559712 ||  || — || November 19, 2008 || Kitt Peak || Spacewatch ||  || align=right | 3.2 km || 
|-id=713 bgcolor=#d6d6d6
| 559713 ||  || — || October 3, 2013 || Kitt Peak || Spacewatch ||  || align=right | 2.7 km || 
|-id=714 bgcolor=#d6d6d6
| 559714 ||  || — || October 16, 2012 || Mount Lemmon || Mount Lemmon Survey ||  || align=right | 2.7 km || 
|-id=715 bgcolor=#d6d6d6
| 559715 ||  || — || February 19, 2015 || Haleakala || Pan-STARRS ||  || align=right | 2.4 km || 
|-id=716 bgcolor=#E9E9E9
| 559716 ||  || — || November 28, 2013 || Mount Lemmon || Mount Lemmon Survey ||  || align=right data-sort-value="0.91" | 910 m || 
|-id=717 bgcolor=#d6d6d6
| 559717 ||  || — || August 31, 2011 || Piszkesteto || K. Sárneczky ||  || align=right | 3.7 km || 
|-id=718 bgcolor=#d6d6d6
| 559718 ||  || — || August 20, 2001 || Cerro Tololo || Cerro Tololo Obs. ||  || align=right | 2.8 km || 
|-id=719 bgcolor=#d6d6d6
| 559719 ||  || — || October 24, 2008 || Kitt Peak || Spacewatch ||  || align=right | 2.1 km || 
|-id=720 bgcolor=#d6d6d6
| 559720 ||  || — || November 24, 2014 || Mount Lemmon || Mount Lemmon Survey ||  || align=right | 3.5 km || 
|-id=721 bgcolor=#d6d6d6
| 559721 ||  || — || October 9, 2007 || Catalina || CSS ||  || align=right | 3.2 km || 
|-id=722 bgcolor=#d6d6d6
| 559722 ||  || — || January 2, 2009 || Mount Lemmon || Mount Lemmon Survey ||  || align=right | 2.7 km || 
|-id=723 bgcolor=#d6d6d6
| 559723 ||  || — || October 20, 2007 || Mount Lemmon || Mount Lemmon Survey ||  || align=right | 2.9 km || 
|-id=724 bgcolor=#d6d6d6
| 559724 ||  || — || April 9, 2010 || Mount Lemmon || Mount Lemmon Survey ||  || align=right | 2.8 km || 
|-id=725 bgcolor=#d6d6d6
| 559725 ||  || — || February 20, 2015 || Haleakala || Pan-STARRS ||  || align=right | 2.5 km || 
|-id=726 bgcolor=#d6d6d6
| 559726 ||  || — || February 20, 2015 || Haleakala || Pan-STARRS ||  || align=right | 2.2 km || 
|-id=727 bgcolor=#d6d6d6
| 559727 ||  || — || December 29, 2008 || Kitt Peak || Spacewatch || TIR || align=right | 2.1 km || 
|-id=728 bgcolor=#d6d6d6
| 559728 ||  || — || January 15, 2015 || Haleakala || Pan-STARRS ||  || align=right | 2.7 km || 
|-id=729 bgcolor=#d6d6d6
| 559729 ||  || — || October 14, 2013 || Kitt Peak || Spacewatch ||  || align=right | 2.3 km || 
|-id=730 bgcolor=#d6d6d6
| 559730 ||  || — || January 17, 2015 || Haleakala || Pan-STARRS ||  || align=right | 2.8 km || 
|-id=731 bgcolor=#d6d6d6
| 559731 ||  || — || January 17, 2015 || Haleakala || Pan-STARRS ||  || align=right | 3.1 km || 
|-id=732 bgcolor=#d6d6d6
| 559732 ||  || — || July 20, 2001 || Palomar || NEAT ||  || align=right | 2.9 km || 
|-id=733 bgcolor=#d6d6d6
| 559733 ||  || — || October 10, 2007 || Kitt Peak || Spacewatch ||  || align=right | 2.6 km || 
|-id=734 bgcolor=#d6d6d6
| 559734 ||  || — || January 17, 2015 || Haleakala || Pan-STARRS ||  || align=right | 2.7 km || 
|-id=735 bgcolor=#d6d6d6
| 559735 ||  || — || December 31, 2008 || Kitt Peak || Spacewatch ||  || align=right | 2.7 km || 
|-id=736 bgcolor=#d6d6d6
| 559736 ||  || — || January 20, 2009 || Kitt Peak || Spacewatch ||  || align=right | 2.9 km || 
|-id=737 bgcolor=#d6d6d6
| 559737 ||  || — || November 11, 2013 || Kitt Peak || Spacewatch ||  || align=right | 2.3 km || 
|-id=738 bgcolor=#d6d6d6
| 559738 ||  || — || November 3, 2007 || Mount Lemmon || Mount Lemmon Survey ||  || align=right | 2.4 km || 
|-id=739 bgcolor=#d6d6d6
| 559739 ||  || — || December 7, 2013 || Haleakala || Pan-STARRS ||  || align=right | 2.8 km || 
|-id=740 bgcolor=#d6d6d6
| 559740 ||  || — || May 24, 2011 || Haleakala || Pan-STARRS ||  || align=right | 3.2 km || 
|-id=741 bgcolor=#d6d6d6
| 559741 ||  || — || November 27, 2013 || Haleakala || Pan-STARRS ||  || align=right | 2.5 km || 
|-id=742 bgcolor=#d6d6d6
| 559742 ||  || — || November 27, 2013 || Haleakala || Pan-STARRS ||  || align=right | 2.4 km || 
|-id=743 bgcolor=#d6d6d6
| 559743 ||  || — || October 6, 2007 || Eskridge || G. Hug ||  || align=right | 2.6 km || 
|-id=744 bgcolor=#d6d6d6
| 559744 ||  || — || November 10, 1996 || Kitt Peak || Spacewatch ||  || align=right | 2.8 km || 
|-id=745 bgcolor=#d6d6d6
| 559745 ||  || — || October 14, 2007 || Mount Lemmon || Mount Lemmon Survey ||  || align=right | 2.3 km || 
|-id=746 bgcolor=#d6d6d6
| 559746 ||  || — || October 15, 2007 || Kitt Peak || Spacewatch ||  || align=right | 2.3 km || 
|-id=747 bgcolor=#d6d6d6
| 559747 ||  || — || December 22, 2008 || Kitt Peak || Spacewatch ||  || align=right | 2.4 km || 
|-id=748 bgcolor=#d6d6d6
| 559748 ||  || — || January 29, 2015 || Haleakala || Pan-STARRS ||  || align=right | 2.9 km || 
|-id=749 bgcolor=#d6d6d6
| 559749 ||  || — || January 29, 2003 || Apache Point || SDSS Collaboration ||  || align=right | 2.5 km || 
|-id=750 bgcolor=#d6d6d6
| 559750 ||  || — || October 20, 2007 || Mount Lemmon || Mount Lemmon Survey ||  || align=right | 2.0 km || 
|-id=751 bgcolor=#d6d6d6
| 559751 ||  || — || January 27, 2015 || Haleakala || Pan-STARRS ||  || align=right | 2.2 km || 
|-id=752 bgcolor=#d6d6d6
| 559752 ||  || — || December 10, 2013 || Mount Lemmon || Mount Lemmon Survey ||  || align=right | 2.8 km || 
|-id=753 bgcolor=#d6d6d6
| 559753 ||  || — || November 26, 2014 || Haleakala || Pan-STARRS ||  || align=right | 3.9 km || 
|-id=754 bgcolor=#d6d6d6
| 559754 ||  || — || August 1, 2011 || Haleakala || Pan-STARRS ||  || align=right | 2.3 km || 
|-id=755 bgcolor=#d6d6d6
| 559755 ||  || — || May 10, 2005 || Cerro Tololo || M. W. Buie, L. H. Wasserman ||  || align=right | 4.1 km || 
|-id=756 bgcolor=#d6d6d6
| 559756 ||  || — || November 9, 2013 || Haleakala || Pan-STARRS ||  || align=right | 1.9 km || 
|-id=757 bgcolor=#d6d6d6
| 559757 ||  || — || February 20, 2015 || Haleakala || Pan-STARRS ||  || align=right | 2.4 km || 
|-id=758 bgcolor=#d6d6d6
| 559758 ||  || — || February 20, 2015 || Haleakala || Pan-STARRS ||  || align=right | 2.7 km || 
|-id=759 bgcolor=#d6d6d6
| 559759 ||  || — || October 5, 2013 || Kitt Peak || Spacewatch ||  || align=right | 2.5 km || 
|-id=760 bgcolor=#d6d6d6
| 559760 ||  || — || February 18, 2015 || Mount Lemmon || Mount Lemmon Survey ||  || align=right | 2.0 km || 
|-id=761 bgcolor=#d6d6d6
| 559761 ||  || — || November 27, 2013 || Kitt Peak || Spacewatch ||  || align=right | 2.7 km || 
|-id=762 bgcolor=#d6d6d6
| 559762 ||  || — || October 27, 2008 || Kitt Peak || Spacewatch ||  || align=right | 2.6 km || 
|-id=763 bgcolor=#d6d6d6
| 559763 ||  || — || May 8, 2011 || Mount Lemmon || Mount Lemmon Survey ||  || align=right | 2.2 km || 
|-id=764 bgcolor=#d6d6d6
| 559764 ||  || — || March 16, 2010 || Mount Lemmon || Mount Lemmon Survey ||  || align=right | 2.3 km || 
|-id=765 bgcolor=#d6d6d6
| 559765 ||  || — || February 18, 2010 || Kitt Peak || Spacewatch ||  || align=right | 2.9 km || 
|-id=766 bgcolor=#d6d6d6
| 559766 ||  || — || October 27, 2008 || Kitt Peak || Spacewatch ||  || align=right | 2.1 km || 
|-id=767 bgcolor=#d6d6d6
| 559767 ||  || — || April 2, 2005 || Mount Lemmon || Mount Lemmon Survey ||  || align=right | 2.2 km || 
|-id=768 bgcolor=#d6d6d6
| 559768 ||  || — || December 16, 2007 || Kitt Peak || Spacewatch ||  || align=right | 3.5 km || 
|-id=769 bgcolor=#d6d6d6
| 559769 ||  || — || February 22, 2015 || Haleakala || Pan-STARRS ||  || align=right | 2.9 km || 
|-id=770 bgcolor=#fefefe
| 559770 ||  || — || November 22, 2006 || Mount Lemmon || Mount Lemmon Survey || H || align=right data-sort-value="0.77" | 770 m || 
|-id=771 bgcolor=#fefefe
| 559771 ||  || — || November 26, 2011 || XuYi || PMO NEO || H || align=right data-sort-value="0.69" | 690 m || 
|-id=772 bgcolor=#fefefe
| 559772 ||  || — || February 24, 2015 || Haleakala || Pan-STARRS || H || align=right data-sort-value="0.72" | 720 m || 
|-id=773 bgcolor=#d6d6d6
| 559773 ||  || — || October 11, 2007 || Mount Lemmon || Mount Lemmon Survey ||  || align=right | 2.5 km || 
|-id=774 bgcolor=#d6d6d6
| 559774 ||  || — || September 15, 2007 || Mount Lemmon || Mount Lemmon Survey ||  || align=right | 2.2 km || 
|-id=775 bgcolor=#d6d6d6
| 559775 ||  || — || February 23, 2015 || Haleakala || Pan-STARRS ||  || align=right | 2.3 km || 
|-id=776 bgcolor=#d6d6d6
| 559776 ||  || — || October 9, 2007 || Kitt Peak || Spacewatch ||  || align=right | 2.6 km || 
|-id=777 bgcolor=#d6d6d6
| 559777 ||  || — || January 2, 2014 || Mount Lemmon || Mount Lemmon Survey ||  || align=right | 2.3 km || 
|-id=778 bgcolor=#d6d6d6
| 559778 ||  || — || October 17, 2001 || Palomar || NEAT ||  || align=right | 3.0 km || 
|-id=779 bgcolor=#d6d6d6
| 559779 ||  || — || October 18, 2012 || Haleakala || Pan-STARRS ||  || align=right | 2.9 km || 
|-id=780 bgcolor=#d6d6d6
| 559780 ||  || — || September 14, 2007 || Mount Lemmon || Mount Lemmon Survey ||  || align=right | 2.3 km || 
|-id=781 bgcolor=#d6d6d6
| 559781 ||  || — || October 11, 2001 || Socorro || LINEAR ||  || align=right | 3.1 km || 
|-id=782 bgcolor=#fefefe
| 559782 ||  || — || January 17, 2007 || Kitt Peak || Spacewatch ||  || align=right data-sort-value="0.69" | 690 m || 
|-id=783 bgcolor=#d6d6d6
| 559783 ||  || — || January 1, 2014 || Haleakala || Pan-STARRS ||  || align=right | 2.6 km || 
|-id=784 bgcolor=#d6d6d6
| 559784 ||  || — || March 22, 2009 || Catalina || CSS ||  || align=right | 3.3 km || 
|-id=785 bgcolor=#d6d6d6
| 559785 ||  || — || November 11, 2012 || Nogales || M. Schwartz, P. R. Holvorcem ||  || align=right | 4.1 km || 
|-id=786 bgcolor=#d6d6d6
| 559786 ||  || — || August 10, 2007 || Kitt Peak || Spacewatch ||  || align=right | 2.5 km || 
|-id=787 bgcolor=#d6d6d6
| 559787 ||  || — || February 23, 2015 || Haleakala || Pan-STARRS ||  || align=right | 2.9 km || 
|-id=788 bgcolor=#d6d6d6
| 559788 ||  || — || January 18, 2009 || Kitt Peak || Spacewatch ||  || align=right | 2.4 km || 
|-id=789 bgcolor=#fefefe
| 559789 ||  || — || June 18, 2013 || Haleakala || Pan-STARRS || H || align=right data-sort-value="0.86" | 860 m || 
|-id=790 bgcolor=#d6d6d6
| 559790 ||  || — || October 8, 2012 || Mount Lemmon || Mount Lemmon Survey ||  || align=right | 2.5 km || 
|-id=791 bgcolor=#d6d6d6
| 559791 ||  || — || January 17, 2004 || Palomar || NEAT || EOS || align=right | 2.2 km || 
|-id=792 bgcolor=#d6d6d6
| 559792 ||  || — || September 19, 2001 || Kitt Peak || Spacewatch ||  || align=right | 2.6 km || 
|-id=793 bgcolor=#d6d6d6
| 559793 ||  || — || September 16, 2012 || Nogales || M. Schwartz, P. R. Holvorcem || EOS || align=right | 1.9 km || 
|-id=794 bgcolor=#d6d6d6
| 559794 ||  || — || April 8, 2010 || Kitt Peak || Spacewatch ||  || align=right | 2.7 km || 
|-id=795 bgcolor=#d6d6d6
| 559795 ||  || — || September 11, 2007 || Mount Lemmon || Mount Lemmon Survey ||  || align=right | 2.2 km || 
|-id=796 bgcolor=#d6d6d6
| 559796 ||  || — || October 9, 2012 || Mount Lemmon || Mount Lemmon Survey ||  || align=right | 2.9 km || 
|-id=797 bgcolor=#d6d6d6
| 559797 ||  || — || August 14, 2012 || Haleakala || Pan-STARRS ||  || align=right | 2.6 km || 
|-id=798 bgcolor=#d6d6d6
| 559798 ||  || — || February 20, 2015 || Haleakala || Pan-STARRS ||  || align=right | 2.2 km || 
|-id=799 bgcolor=#d6d6d6
| 559799 ||  || — || January 21, 2015 || Mount Lemmon || Mount Lemmon Survey ||  || align=right | 2.6 km || 
|-id=800 bgcolor=#C2E0FF
| 559800 ||  || — || April 13, 2011 || Haleakala || Pan-STARRS || SDOcritical || align=right | 226 km || 
|}

559801–559900 

|-bgcolor=#C2E0FF
| 559801 ||  || — || February 16, 2015 || Haleakala || Pan-STARRS || SDOcritical || align=right | 213 km || 
|-id=802 bgcolor=#fefefe
| 559802 ||  || — || March 16, 2012 || Haleakala || Pan-STARRS ||  || align=right data-sort-value="0.50" | 500 m || 
|-id=803 bgcolor=#fefefe
| 559803 ||  || — || December 6, 2011 || Haleakala || Pan-STARRS || H || align=right data-sort-value="0.70" | 700 m || 
|-id=804 bgcolor=#fefefe
| 559804 ||  || — || February 16, 2015 || Haleakala || Pan-STARRS || H || align=right data-sort-value="0.51" | 510 m || 
|-id=805 bgcolor=#d6d6d6
| 559805 ||  || — || February 16, 2015 || Haleakala || Pan-STARRS ||  || align=right | 2.3 km || 
|-id=806 bgcolor=#d6d6d6
| 559806 ||  || — || February 19, 2015 || Haleakala || Pan-STARRS ||  || align=right | 2.9 km || 
|-id=807 bgcolor=#d6d6d6
| 559807 ||  || — || August 23, 2011 || Haleakala || Pan-STARRS ||  || align=right | 2.2 km || 
|-id=808 bgcolor=#d6d6d6
| 559808 ||  || — || February 16, 2015 || Haleakala || Pan-STARRS ||  || align=right | 2.0 km || 
|-id=809 bgcolor=#d6d6d6
| 559809 ||  || — || February 25, 2015 || Haleakala || Pan-STARRS ||  || align=right | 2.0 km || 
|-id=810 bgcolor=#d6d6d6
| 559810 ||  || — || November 3, 2007 || Mount Lemmon || Mount Lemmon Survey ||  || align=right | 3.3 km || 
|-id=811 bgcolor=#d6d6d6
| 559811 ||  || — || December 9, 2013 || XuYi || PMO NEO ||  || align=right | 3.1 km || 
|-id=812 bgcolor=#d6d6d6
| 559812 ||  || — || December 4, 2008 || Kitt Peak || Spacewatch ||  || align=right | 2.1 km || 
|-id=813 bgcolor=#d6d6d6
| 559813 ||  || — || January 20, 2015 || Haleakala || Pan-STARRS ||  || align=right | 2.2 km || 
|-id=814 bgcolor=#d6d6d6
| 559814 ||  || — || January 20, 2009 || Mount Lemmon || Mount Lemmon Survey ||  || align=right | 2.1 km || 
|-id=815 bgcolor=#d6d6d6
| 559815 ||  || — || February 27, 2015 || Haleakala || Pan-STARRS ||  || align=right | 2.6 km || 
|-id=816 bgcolor=#d6d6d6
| 559816 ||  || — || March 23, 2009 || Calar Alto || F. Hormuth || 7:4 || align=right | 2.9 km || 
|-id=817 bgcolor=#d6d6d6
| 559817 ||  || — || January 22, 2015 || Haleakala || Pan-STARRS ||  || align=right | 2.0 km || 
|-id=818 bgcolor=#d6d6d6
| 559818 ||  || — || March 18, 2010 || Kitt Peak || Spacewatch ||  || align=right | 1.9 km || 
|-id=819 bgcolor=#d6d6d6
| 559819 ||  || — || September 17, 2006 || Kitt Peak || Spacewatch ||  || align=right | 2.9 km || 
|-id=820 bgcolor=#d6d6d6
| 559820 ||  || — || January 27, 2015 || Haleakala || Pan-STARRS ||  || align=right | 2.4 km || 
|-id=821 bgcolor=#d6d6d6
| 559821 ||  || — || February 16, 2015 || Haleakala || Pan-STARRS ||  || align=right | 1.9 km || 
|-id=822 bgcolor=#d6d6d6
| 559822 ||  || — || September 17, 2006 || Kitt Peak || Spacewatch ||  || align=right | 2.2 km || 
|-id=823 bgcolor=#d6d6d6
| 559823 ||  || — || November 11, 2013 || Mount Lemmon || Mount Lemmon Survey ||  || align=right | 2.2 km || 
|-id=824 bgcolor=#d6d6d6
| 559824 ||  || — || November 28, 2013 || Mount Lemmon || Mount Lemmon Survey ||  || align=right | 2.3 km || 
|-id=825 bgcolor=#d6d6d6
| 559825 ||  || — || January 29, 2015 || Haleakala || Pan-STARRS ||  || align=right | 2.6 km || 
|-id=826 bgcolor=#d6d6d6
| 559826 ||  || — || February 17, 2015 || Haleakala || Pan-STARRS ||  || align=right | 2.3 km || 
|-id=827 bgcolor=#d6d6d6
| 559827 ||  || — || January 19, 2015 || Haleakala || Pan-STARRS ||  || align=right | 2.2 km || 
|-id=828 bgcolor=#d6d6d6
| 559828 ||  || — || February 19, 2015 || Haleakala || Pan-STARRS ||  || align=right | 2.2 km || 
|-id=829 bgcolor=#d6d6d6
| 559829 ||  || — || January 19, 2015 || Haleakala || Pan-STARRS ||  || align=right | 2.4 km || 
|-id=830 bgcolor=#d6d6d6
| 559830 ||  || — || January 17, 2015 || Kitt Peak || Pan-STARRS ||  || align=right | 2.3 km || 
|-id=831 bgcolor=#d6d6d6
| 559831 ||  || — || July 31, 2011 || La Sagra || OAM Obs. ||  || align=right | 3.7 km || 
|-id=832 bgcolor=#d6d6d6
| 559832 ||  || — || December 10, 2013 || Mount Lemmon || Mount Lemmon Survey ||  || align=right | 2.5 km || 
|-id=833 bgcolor=#d6d6d6
| 559833 ||  || — || January 23, 2015 || Haleakala || Pan-STARRS ||  || align=right | 2.9 km || 
|-id=834 bgcolor=#d6d6d6
| 559834 ||  || — || January 26, 2015 || Haleakala || Pan-STARRS ||  || align=right | 3.1 km || 
|-id=835 bgcolor=#d6d6d6
| 559835 ||  || — || February 27, 2015 || Haleakala || Pan-STARRS ||  || align=right | 2.1 km || 
|-id=836 bgcolor=#d6d6d6
| 559836 ||  || — || February 18, 2015 || Haleakala || Pan-STARRS ||  || align=right | 2.9 km || 
|-id=837 bgcolor=#d6d6d6
| 559837 ||  || — || February 18, 2015 || Haleakala || Pan-STARRS ||  || align=right | 2.2 km || 
|-id=838 bgcolor=#d6d6d6
| 559838 ||  || — || February 20, 2015 || Haleakala || Pan-STARRS ||  || align=right | 2.2 km || 
|-id=839 bgcolor=#d6d6d6
| 559839 ||  || — || February 16, 2015 || Haleakala || Pan-STARRS ||  || align=right | 1.9 km || 
|-id=840 bgcolor=#d6d6d6
| 559840 ||  || — || August 31, 2011 || Haleakala || Pan-STARRS ||  || align=right | 2.5 km || 
|-id=841 bgcolor=#d6d6d6
| 559841 ||  || — || July 28, 2011 || Haleakala || Pan-STARRS ||  || align=right | 2.4 km || 
|-id=842 bgcolor=#d6d6d6
| 559842 ||  || — || February 16, 2015 || Haleakala || Pan-STARRS ||  || align=right | 1.8 km || 
|-id=843 bgcolor=#d6d6d6
| 559843 ||  || — || February 16, 2015 || Haleakala || Pan-STARRS ||  || align=right | 2.3 km || 
|-id=844 bgcolor=#d6d6d6
| 559844 ||  || — || October 16, 2012 || Mount Lemmon || Mount Lemmon Survey ||  || align=right | 2.3 km || 
|-id=845 bgcolor=#d6d6d6
| 559845 ||  || — || February 17, 2015 || Haleakala || Pan-STARRS ||  || align=right | 2.9 km || 
|-id=846 bgcolor=#d6d6d6
| 559846 ||  || — || February 16, 2015 || Haleakala || Pan-STARRS ||  || align=right | 2.2 km || 
|-id=847 bgcolor=#d6d6d6
| 559847 ||  || — || February 16, 2015 || Haleakala || Pan-STARRS ||  || align=right | 2.4 km || 
|-id=848 bgcolor=#d6d6d6
| 559848 ||  || — || February 17, 2015 || Haleakala || Pan-STARRS ||  || align=right | 2.7 km || 
|-id=849 bgcolor=#d6d6d6
| 559849 ||  || — || February 27, 2015 || Haleakala || Pan-STARRS ||  || align=right | 2.1 km || 
|-id=850 bgcolor=#d6d6d6
| 559850 ||  || — || February 16, 2015 || Kitt Peak || Pan-STARRS ||  || align=right | 2.3 km || 
|-id=851 bgcolor=#d6d6d6
| 559851 ||  || — || February 20, 2015 || Haleakala || Pan-STARRS ||  || align=right | 2.6 km || 
|-id=852 bgcolor=#d6d6d6
| 559852 ||  || — || February 20, 2015 || Haleakala || Pan-STARRS ||  || align=right | 2.1 km || 
|-id=853 bgcolor=#d6d6d6
| 559853 ||  || — || August 22, 2012 || Haleakala || Pan-STARRS ||  || align=right | 2.1 km || 
|-id=854 bgcolor=#d6d6d6
| 559854 ||  || — || September 2, 2000 || Kitt Peak || Spacewatch ||  || align=right | 2.6 km || 
|-id=855 bgcolor=#d6d6d6
| 559855 ||  || — || February 24, 2015 || Haleakala || Pan-STARRS ||  || align=right | 2.4 km || 
|-id=856 bgcolor=#d6d6d6
| 559856 ||  || — || February 20, 2015 || Mount Lemmon || Mount Lemmon Survey ||  || align=right | 2.5 km || 
|-id=857 bgcolor=#d6d6d6
| 559857 ||  || — || August 26, 2012 || Haleakala || Pan-STARRS ||  || align=right | 2.0 km || 
|-id=858 bgcolor=#d6d6d6
| 559858 ||  || — || February 17, 2015 || Haleakala || Pan-STARRS ||  || align=right | 2.0 km || 
|-id=859 bgcolor=#d6d6d6
| 559859 ||  || — || February 18, 2015 || Haleakala || Pan-STARRS || Tj (2.99) || align=right | 3.0 km || 
|-id=860 bgcolor=#d6d6d6
| 559860 ||  || — || February 16, 2015 || Haleakala || Pan-STARRS ||  || align=right | 2.0 km || 
|-id=861 bgcolor=#d6d6d6
| 559861 ||  || — || November 27, 2013 || Mount Lemmon || Mount Lemmon Survey ||  || align=right | 1.7 km || 
|-id=862 bgcolor=#d6d6d6
| 559862 ||  || — || October 23, 2012 || Haleakala || Pan-STARRS ||  || align=right | 2.3 km || 
|-id=863 bgcolor=#d6d6d6
| 559863 ||  || — || February 18, 2015 || Haleakala || Pan-STARRS ||  || align=right | 2.2 km || 
|-id=864 bgcolor=#d6d6d6
| 559864 ||  || — || February 20, 2015 || Haleakala || Pan-STARRS ||  || align=right | 1.9 km || 
|-id=865 bgcolor=#d6d6d6
| 559865 ||  || — || February 23, 2015 || Haleakala || Pan-STARRS ||  || align=right | 2.8 km || 
|-id=866 bgcolor=#d6d6d6
| 559866 ||  || — || February 24, 2015 || Haleakala || Pan-STARRS ||  || align=right | 1.8 km || 
|-id=867 bgcolor=#d6d6d6
| 559867 ||  || — || February 16, 2015 || Haleakala || Pan-STARRS ||  || align=right | 2.2 km || 
|-id=868 bgcolor=#d6d6d6
| 559868 ||  || — || February 17, 2015 || Haleakala || Pan-STARRS ||  || align=right | 2.5 km || 
|-id=869 bgcolor=#d6d6d6
| 559869 ||  || — || February 18, 2015 || Mount Lemmon || Mount Lemmon Survey ||  || align=right | 2.6 km || 
|-id=870 bgcolor=#d6d6d6
| 559870 ||  || — || February 24, 2015 || Haleakala || Pan-STARRS ||  || align=right | 2.2 km || 
|-id=871 bgcolor=#d6d6d6
| 559871 ||  || — || September 25, 2012 || Mount Lemmon || Mount Lemmon Survey ||  || align=right | 2.2 km || 
|-id=872 bgcolor=#d6d6d6
| 559872 ||  || — || February 16, 2015 || Haleakala || Pan-STARRS ||  || align=right | 2.0 km || 
|-id=873 bgcolor=#d6d6d6
| 559873 ||  || — || February 17, 2015 || Haleakala || Pan-STARRS ||  || align=right | 2.3 km || 
|-id=874 bgcolor=#d6d6d6
| 559874 ||  || — || February 23, 2015 || Haleakala || Pan-STARRS || 7:4 || align=right | 3.6 km || 
|-id=875 bgcolor=#d6d6d6
| 559875 ||  || — || February 16, 2015 || Haleakala || Pan-STARRS ||  || align=right | 1.8 km || 
|-id=876 bgcolor=#d6d6d6
| 559876 ||  || — || November 4, 2007 || Mount Lemmon || Mount Lemmon Survey ||  || align=right | 2.1 km || 
|-id=877 bgcolor=#d6d6d6
| 559877 ||  || — || February 17, 2015 || Haleakala || Pan-STARRS || 7:4 || align=right | 3.5 km || 
|-id=878 bgcolor=#d6d6d6
| 559878 ||  || — || January 30, 2004 || Kitt Peak || Spacewatch ||  || align=right | 1.9 km || 
|-id=879 bgcolor=#d6d6d6
| 559879 ||  || — || September 3, 2000 || Kitt Peak || Spacewatch ||  || align=right | 2.7 km || 
|-id=880 bgcolor=#d6d6d6
| 559880 ||  || — || February 14, 2005 || Kitt Peak || Spacewatch ||  || align=right | 1.8 km || 
|-id=881 bgcolor=#d6d6d6
| 559881 ||  || — || February 16, 2015 || Haleakala || Pan-STARRS ||  || align=right | 2.2 km || 
|-id=882 bgcolor=#d6d6d6
| 559882 ||  || — || October 8, 2007 || Mount Lemmon || Mount Lemmon Survey ||  || align=right | 2.5 km || 
|-id=883 bgcolor=#d6d6d6
| 559883 ||  || — || April 12, 2005 || Kitt Peak || Kitt Peak Obs. ||  || align=right | 2.5 km || 
|-id=884 bgcolor=#d6d6d6
| 559884 ||  || — || January 15, 2015 || Haleakala || Pan-STARRS ||  || align=right | 2.6 km || 
|-id=885 bgcolor=#d6d6d6
| 559885 ||  || — || January 21, 2015 || Haleakala || Pan-STARRS ||  || align=right | 2.3 km || 
|-id=886 bgcolor=#d6d6d6
| 559886 ||  || — || November 29, 2013 || Haleakala || Pan-STARRS ||  || align=right | 2.6 km || 
|-id=887 bgcolor=#d6d6d6
| 559887 ||  || — || January 22, 2015 || Haleakala || Pan-STARRS ||  || align=right | 2.4 km || 
|-id=888 bgcolor=#d6d6d6
| 559888 ||  || — || January 25, 2015 || Haleakala || Pan-STARRS ||  || align=right | 3.0 km || 
|-id=889 bgcolor=#d6d6d6
| 559889 ||  || — || November 26, 2014 || Haleakala || Pan-STARRS ||  || align=right | 2.6 km || 
|-id=890 bgcolor=#d6d6d6
| 559890 ||  || — || January 25, 2015 || Haleakala || Pan-STARRS ||  || align=right | 2.8 km || 
|-id=891 bgcolor=#d6d6d6
| 559891 ||  || — || February 16, 2004 || Kitt Peak || Spacewatch ||  || align=right | 3.6 km || 
|-id=892 bgcolor=#d6d6d6
| 559892 ||  || — || September 22, 2007 || Altschwendt || W. Ries ||  || align=right | 2.3 km || 
|-id=893 bgcolor=#d6d6d6
| 559893 ||  || — || August 19, 2002 || Palomar || NEAT ||  || align=right | 2.8 km || 
|-id=894 bgcolor=#d6d6d6
| 559894 ||  || — || September 30, 2013 || Mount Lemmon || Mount Lemmon Survey ||  || align=right | 2.4 km || 
|-id=895 bgcolor=#d6d6d6
| 559895 ||  || — || October 5, 2007 || Kitt Peak || Spacewatch ||  || align=right | 2.5 km || 
|-id=896 bgcolor=#d6d6d6
| 559896 ||  || — || November 6, 2013 || Haleakala || Pan-STARRS ||  || align=right | 2.7 km || 
|-id=897 bgcolor=#d6d6d6
| 559897 ||  || — || August 17, 2012 || Haleakala || Pan-STARRS ||  || align=right | 2.4 km || 
|-id=898 bgcolor=#d6d6d6
| 559898 ||  || — || January 22, 2015 || Haleakala || Pan-STARRS ||  || align=right | 2.2 km || 
|-id=899 bgcolor=#d6d6d6
| 559899 ||  || — || January 23, 2015 || Haleakala || Pan-STARRS ||  || align=right | 2.4 km || 
|-id=900 bgcolor=#d6d6d6
| 559900 ||  || — || November 27, 2013 || Haleakala || Pan-STARRS ||  || align=right | 2.4 km || 
|}

559901–560000 

|-bgcolor=#d6d6d6
| 559901 ||  || — || September 11, 2007 || Kitt Peak || Spacewatch ||  || align=right | 2.9 km || 
|-id=902 bgcolor=#d6d6d6
| 559902 ||  || — || December 4, 2008 || Mount Lemmon || Mount Lemmon Survey ||  || align=right | 2.4 km || 
|-id=903 bgcolor=#fefefe
| 559903 ||  || — || April 12, 2008 || Kitt Peak || Spacewatch ||  || align=right data-sort-value="0.53" | 530 m || 
|-id=904 bgcolor=#d6d6d6
| 559904 ||  || — || November 30, 2008 || Kitt Peak || Spacewatch ||  || align=right | 2.2 km || 
|-id=905 bgcolor=#d6d6d6
| 559905 ||  || — || January 15, 2015 || Haleakala || Pan-STARRS ||  || align=right | 2.6 km || 
|-id=906 bgcolor=#d6d6d6
| 559906 ||  || — || July 8, 2002 || Palomar || NEAT ||  || align=right | 2.8 km || 
|-id=907 bgcolor=#d6d6d6
| 559907 ||  || — || October 11, 1996 || Kitt Peak || Spacewatch ||  || align=right | 2.9 km || 
|-id=908 bgcolor=#d6d6d6
| 559908 ||  || — || November 6, 2013 || Haleakala || Pan-STARRS ||  || align=right | 2.4 km || 
|-id=909 bgcolor=#d6d6d6
| 559909 ||  || — || August 21, 2001 || Kitt Peak || Spacewatch ||  || align=right | 2.3 km || 
|-id=910 bgcolor=#d6d6d6
| 559910 ||  || — || October 26, 2013 || Mount Lemmon || Mount Lemmon Survey ||  || align=right | 2.0 km || 
|-id=911 bgcolor=#d6d6d6
| 559911 ||  || — || November 11, 2013 || Kitt Peak || Spacewatch ||  || align=right | 2.4 km || 
|-id=912 bgcolor=#d6d6d6
| 559912 ||  || — || September 12, 2007 || Mount Lemmon || Mount Lemmon Survey ||  || align=right | 2.2 km || 
|-id=913 bgcolor=#d6d6d6
| 559913 ||  || — || November 24, 2008 || Kitt Peak || Spacewatch ||  || align=right | 2.0 km || 
|-id=914 bgcolor=#d6d6d6
| 559914 ||  || — || January 16, 2015 || Haleakala || Pan-STARRS ||  || align=right | 2.6 km || 
|-id=915 bgcolor=#d6d6d6
| 559915 ||  || — || November 10, 2013 || Mount Lemmon || Mount Lemmon Survey ||  || align=right | 2.3 km || 
|-id=916 bgcolor=#d6d6d6
| 559916 ||  || — || August 25, 2012 || Kitt Peak || Spacewatch ||  || align=right | 2.9 km || 
|-id=917 bgcolor=#d6d6d6
| 559917 ||  || — || February 16, 2004 || Kitt Peak || Spacewatch ||  || align=right | 3.2 km || 
|-id=918 bgcolor=#d6d6d6
| 559918 ||  || — || September 12, 2007 || Mount Lemmon || Mount Lemmon Survey ||  || align=right | 2.3 km || 
|-id=919 bgcolor=#d6d6d6
| 559919 ||  || — || March 14, 2015 || Haleakala || Pan-STARRS ||  || align=right | 2.4 km || 
|-id=920 bgcolor=#d6d6d6
| 559920 ||  || — || December 7, 2013 || Haleakala || Pan-STARRS ||  || align=right | 2.3 km || 
|-id=921 bgcolor=#d6d6d6
| 559921 ||  || — || October 10, 2007 || Kitt Peak || Spacewatch ||  || align=right | 2.8 km || 
|-id=922 bgcolor=#d6d6d6
| 559922 ||  || — || August 26, 2012 || Haleakala || Pan-STARRS ||  || align=right | 2.9 km || 
|-id=923 bgcolor=#d6d6d6
| 559923 ||  || — || September 13, 2007 || Mount Lemmon || Mount Lemmon Survey ||  || align=right | 2.0 km || 
|-id=924 bgcolor=#d6d6d6
| 559924 ||  || — || March 19, 2010 || Mount Lemmon || Mount Lemmon Survey ||  || align=right | 2.2 km || 
|-id=925 bgcolor=#d6d6d6
| 559925 ||  || — || January 21, 2015 || Haleakala || Pan-STARRS ||  || align=right | 1.8 km || 
|-id=926 bgcolor=#d6d6d6
| 559926 ||  || — || January 21, 2015 || Haleakala || Pan-STARRS ||  || align=right | 1.8 km || 
|-id=927 bgcolor=#d6d6d6
| 559927 ||  || — || April 2, 2005 || Goodricke-Pigott || R. A. Tucker ||  || align=right | 3.3 km || 
|-id=928 bgcolor=#d6d6d6
| 559928 ||  || — || February 10, 2015 || Mount Lemmon || Mount Lemmon Survey ||  || align=right | 2.6 km || 
|-id=929 bgcolor=#d6d6d6
| 559929 ||  || — || March 14, 2015 || Haleakala || Pan-STARRS ||  || align=right | 2.3 km || 
|-id=930 bgcolor=#d6d6d6
| 559930 ||  || — || August 26, 2012 || Haleakala || Pan-STARRS ||  || align=right | 2.4 km || 
|-id=931 bgcolor=#d6d6d6
| 559931 ||  || — || September 17, 2012 || Mount Lemmon || Mount Lemmon Survey ||  || align=right | 2.0 km || 
|-id=932 bgcolor=#d6d6d6
| 559932 ||  || — || March 14, 2015 || Haleakala || Pan-STARRS ||  || align=right | 2.6 km || 
|-id=933 bgcolor=#d6d6d6
| 559933 ||  || — || February 16, 2015 || Haleakala || Pan-STARRS ||  || align=right | 2.1 km || 
|-id=934 bgcolor=#d6d6d6
| 559934 ||  || — || August 23, 2001 || Kitt Peak || Spacewatch ||  || align=right | 2.6 km || 
|-id=935 bgcolor=#d6d6d6
| 559935 ||  || — || January 22, 2015 || Haleakala || Pan-STARRS ||  || align=right | 2.2 km || 
|-id=936 bgcolor=#d6d6d6
| 559936 ||  || — || September 12, 2007 || Mount Lemmon || Mount Lemmon Survey ||  || align=right | 2.5 km || 
|-id=937 bgcolor=#d6d6d6
| 559937 ||  || — || September 11, 2007 || Kitt Peak || Spacewatch ||  || align=right | 2.1 km || 
|-id=938 bgcolor=#d6d6d6
| 559938 ||  || — || October 23, 2008 || Mount Lemmon || Mount Lemmon Survey ||  || align=right | 2.0 km || 
|-id=939 bgcolor=#d6d6d6
| 559939 ||  || — || October 18, 2007 || Kitt Peak || Spacewatch ||  || align=right | 2.3 km || 
|-id=940 bgcolor=#d6d6d6
| 559940 ||  || — || January 29, 2015 || Haleakala || Pan-STARRS ||  || align=right | 2.3 km || 
|-id=941 bgcolor=#d6d6d6
| 559941 ||  || — || August 17, 2012 || Haleakala || Pan-STARRS ||  || align=right | 2.1 km || 
|-id=942 bgcolor=#d6d6d6
| 559942 ||  || — || January 16, 2015 || Haleakala || Pan-STARRS ||  || align=right | 2.5 km || 
|-id=943 bgcolor=#d6d6d6
| 559943 ||  || — || March 14, 2015 || Haleakala || Pan-STARRS ||  || align=right | 2.1 km || 
|-id=944 bgcolor=#d6d6d6
| 559944 ||  || — || August 26, 2001 || Kitt Peak || Spacewatch ||  || align=right | 2.6 km || 
|-id=945 bgcolor=#d6d6d6
| 559945 ||  || — || October 8, 2007 || Mount Lemmon || Mount Lemmon Survey ||  || align=right | 2.4 km || 
|-id=946 bgcolor=#d6d6d6
| 559946 ||  || — || August 29, 2006 || Kitt Peak || Spacewatch ||  || align=right | 2.6 km || 
|-id=947 bgcolor=#d6d6d6
| 559947 ||  || — || September 14, 2007 || Mount Lemmon || Mount Lemmon Survey ||  || align=right | 2.2 km || 
|-id=948 bgcolor=#d6d6d6
| 559948 ||  || — || September 24, 2012 || Kitt Peak || Spacewatch ||  || align=right | 2.5 km || 
|-id=949 bgcolor=#d6d6d6
| 559949 ||  || — || August 26, 2012 || Haleakala || Pan-STARRS ||  || align=right | 2.3 km || 
|-id=950 bgcolor=#d6d6d6
| 559950 ||  || — || December 31, 2008 || Kitt Peak || Spacewatch ||  || align=right | 3.0 km || 
|-id=951 bgcolor=#E9E9E9
| 559951 ||  || — || September 19, 2003 || Kitt Peak || Spacewatch ||  || align=right | 2.3 km || 
|-id=952 bgcolor=#d6d6d6
| 559952 ||  || — || August 13, 2012 || Haleakala || Pan-STARRS ||  || align=right | 2.7 km || 
|-id=953 bgcolor=#d6d6d6
| 559953 ||  || — || September 14, 2007 || Kitt Peak || Spacewatch ||  || align=right | 2.1 km || 
|-id=954 bgcolor=#d6d6d6
| 559954 ||  || — || January 21, 2015 || Haleakala || Pan-STARRS ||  || align=right | 2.3 km || 
|-id=955 bgcolor=#d6d6d6
| 559955 ||  || — || December 27, 2013 || Mount Lemmon || Mount Lemmon Survey ||  || align=right | 2.3 km || 
|-id=956 bgcolor=#d6d6d6
| 559956 ||  || — || November 9, 2013 || Haleakala || Pan-STARRS ||  || align=right | 2.2 km || 
|-id=957 bgcolor=#d6d6d6
| 559957 ||  || — || January 21, 2015 || Haleakala || Pan-STARRS ||  || align=right | 2.2 km || 
|-id=958 bgcolor=#d6d6d6
| 559958 ||  || — || September 15, 2006 || Kitt Peak || Spacewatch ||  || align=right | 3.6 km || 
|-id=959 bgcolor=#d6d6d6
| 559959 ||  || — || August 13, 2012 || Haleakala || Pan-STARRS ||  || align=right | 3.1 km || 
|-id=960 bgcolor=#d6d6d6
| 559960 ||  || — || April 24, 2000 || Kitt Peak || Spacewatch ||  || align=right | 2.1 km || 
|-id=961 bgcolor=#d6d6d6
| 559961 ||  || — || March 29, 2004 || Kitt Peak || Spacewatch ||  || align=right | 3.0 km || 
|-id=962 bgcolor=#d6d6d6
| 559962 ||  || — || February 15, 2015 || Haleakala || Pan-STARRS ||  || align=right | 2.8 km || 
|-id=963 bgcolor=#d6d6d6
| 559963 ||  || — || November 28, 2013 || Haleakala || Pan-STARRS ||  || align=right | 2.1 km || 
|-id=964 bgcolor=#E9E9E9
| 559964 ||  || — || November 2, 2013 || Kitt Peak || Spacewatch ||  || align=right | 1.7 km || 
|-id=965 bgcolor=#E9E9E9
| 559965 ||  || — || October 3, 2013 || Kitt Peak || Mount Lemmon Survey ||  || align=right | 2.4 km || 
|-id=966 bgcolor=#d6d6d6
| 559966 ||  || — || September 11, 2007 || Kitt Peak || Spacewatch ||  || align=right | 2.5 km || 
|-id=967 bgcolor=#d6d6d6
| 559967 ||  || — || January 24, 2015 || Haleakala || Pan-STARRS ||  || align=right | 2.4 km || 
|-id=968 bgcolor=#d6d6d6
| 559968 ||  || — || December 19, 2007 || Mount Lemmon || Mount Lemmon Survey ||  || align=right | 4.1 km || 
|-id=969 bgcolor=#d6d6d6
| 559969 ||  || — || November 28, 2013 || Catalina || CSS ||  || align=right | 2.6 km || 
|-id=970 bgcolor=#d6d6d6
| 559970 ||  || — || January 20, 2015 || Mount Lemmon || Mount Lemmon Survey ||  || align=right | 2.0 km || 
|-id=971 bgcolor=#d6d6d6
| 559971 ||  || — || March 10, 2015 || Kitt Peak || Spacewatch ||  || align=right | 3.7 km || 
|-id=972 bgcolor=#d6d6d6
| 559972 ||  || — || September 15, 2007 || Lulin || LUSS ||  || align=right | 2.7 km || 
|-id=973 bgcolor=#d6d6d6
| 559973 ||  || — || September 11, 2002 || Palomar || NEAT ||  || align=right | 2.9 km || 
|-id=974 bgcolor=#d6d6d6
| 559974 ||  || — || February 17, 2015 || Haleakala || Pan-STARRS ||  || align=right | 2.4 km || 
|-id=975 bgcolor=#d6d6d6
| 559975 ||  || — || August 21, 2001 || Kitt Peak || Spacewatch ||  || align=right | 2.3 km || 
|-id=976 bgcolor=#d6d6d6
| 559976 ||  || — || August 27, 2001 || Kitt Peak || Spacewatch ||  || align=right | 2.9 km || 
|-id=977 bgcolor=#d6d6d6
| 559977 ||  || — || January 21, 2015 || Haleakala || Pan-STARRS ||  || align=right | 2.1 km || 
|-id=978 bgcolor=#d6d6d6
| 559978 ||  || — || August 14, 2012 || Haleakala || Pan-STARRS ||  || align=right | 2.4 km || 
|-id=979 bgcolor=#d6d6d6
| 559979 ||  || — || August 13, 2012 || Haleakala || Pan-STARRS ||  || align=right | 2.4 km || 
|-id=980 bgcolor=#d6d6d6
| 559980 ||  || — || November 29, 2013 || Nogales || M. Schwartz, P. R. Holvorcem ||  || align=right | 2.8 km || 
|-id=981 bgcolor=#d6d6d6
| 559981 ||  || — || March 16, 2004 || Kitt Peak || Spacewatch ||  || align=right | 2.9 km || 
|-id=982 bgcolor=#d6d6d6
| 559982 ||  || — || August 26, 2012 || Haleakala || Pan-STARRS ||  || align=right | 2.3 km || 
|-id=983 bgcolor=#d6d6d6
| 559983 ||  || — || December 30, 2008 || Mount Lemmon || Mount Lemmon Survey ||  || align=right | 3.5 km || 
|-id=984 bgcolor=#d6d6d6
| 559984 ||  || — || March 11, 2015 || Mount Lemmon || Mount Lemmon Survey ||  || align=right | 2.4 km || 
|-id=985 bgcolor=#d6d6d6
| 559985 ||  || — || March 15, 2015 || Haleakala || Pan-STARRS ||  || align=right | 2.5 km || 
|-id=986 bgcolor=#d6d6d6
| 559986 ||  || — || March 15, 2015 || Haleakala || Pan-STARRS ||  || align=right | 2.9 km || 
|-id=987 bgcolor=#d6d6d6
| 559987 ||  || — || March 15, 2015 || Haleakala || Pan-STARRS ||  || align=right | 2.6 km || 
|-id=988 bgcolor=#d6d6d6
| 559988 ||  || — || February 11, 2004 || Kitt Peak || Spacewatch ||  || align=right | 3.4 km || 
|-id=989 bgcolor=#d6d6d6
| 559989 ||  || — || January 12, 2015 || Haleakala || Pan-STARRS || Tj (2.93) || align=right | 3.6 km || 
|-id=990 bgcolor=#d6d6d6
| 559990 ||  || — || February 18, 2010 || Mount Lemmon || Mount Lemmon Survey ||  || align=right | 3.1 km || 
|-id=991 bgcolor=#d6d6d6
| 559991 ||  || — || December 29, 2008 || Kitt Peak || Spacewatch ||  || align=right | 2.9 km || 
|-id=992 bgcolor=#E9E9E9
| 559992 ||  || — || November 27, 2009 || Mount Lemmon || Mount Lemmon Survey ||  || align=right | 2.7 km || 
|-id=993 bgcolor=#d6d6d6
| 559993 ||  || — || November 9, 2013 || Haleakala || Pan-STARRS ||  || align=right | 2.6 km || 
|-id=994 bgcolor=#d6d6d6
| 559994 ||  || — || November 10, 2013 || Oukaimeden || C. Rinner ||  || align=right | 3.2 km || 
|-id=995 bgcolor=#d6d6d6
| 559995 ||  || — || November 21, 2014 || Haleakala || Pan-STARRS ||  || align=right | 2.4 km || 
|-id=996 bgcolor=#d6d6d6
| 559996 ||  || — || January 27, 2015 || Haleakala || Pan-STARRS ||  || align=right | 2.3 km || 
|-id=997 bgcolor=#d6d6d6
| 559997 ||  || — || October 3, 2013 || Haleakala || Pan-STARRS ||  || align=right | 3.4 km || 
|-id=998 bgcolor=#d6d6d6
| 559998 ||  || — || April 7, 2005 || Kitt Peak || Spacewatch ||  || align=right | 2.6 km || 
|-id=999 bgcolor=#d6d6d6
| 559999 ||  || — || April 6, 2011 || Mount Lemmon || Mount Lemmon Survey ||  || align=right | 1.9 km || 
|-id=000 bgcolor=#d6d6d6
| 560000 ||  || — || January 22, 2015 || Haleakala || Pan-STARRS ||  || align=right | 2.6 km || 
|}

References

External links 
 Discovery Circumstances: Numbered Minor Planets (555001)–(560000) (IAU Minor Planet Center)

0559